= Grandpa in his bunker =

Insulting nickname for Vladimir Putin

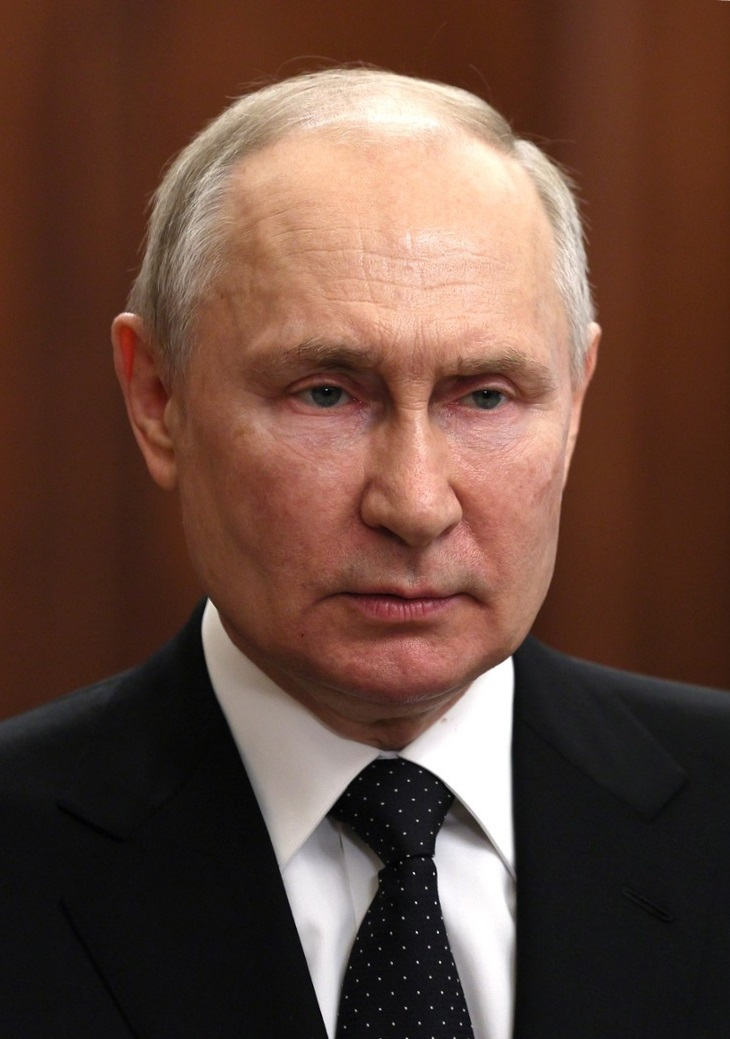
Russian president Vladimir Putin in June 2023

Grandpa in his bunker (Russian: Бункерный дед, romanized: Bunkernyy ded; Ukrainian: Бункерний дід, romanized: Bunkernyi did), also translated as grandpa in a bunker, or bunker grandpa, is an insulting nickname for Russian president Vladimir Putin, which has become an Internet meme in Russia and Ukraine.

== History ==
Vladimir Putin was given the nickname "grandpa in his bunker" thanks to the Internet meme "Grandfather, take your pills or you'll get your ass kicked" that appeared as a slogan at rallies in support of opposition politician Alexei Navalny after his arrest in January 2021. Navalny's team soon launched an investigation about "Putin's Palace" near Gelendzhik, which reportedly houses a gigantic bunker. The investigation came amid talk of Putin's strict self-isolation during the COVID-19 pandemic.

Thus, "bunker" was added to the word "grandpa". Following the Russian invasion of Ukraine, claims began to circulate about "Putin's bunkers" located in the Ural or Altai, from where the president could conduct the war, which made the nickname "grandpa in his bunker" even more popular.

== Usage ==
The nickname "grandpa in his bunker" is used by various Ukrainian observers, Russian opposition publicists, Ukrainian and Russian comedians. This nickname implies any kind of incompetence and irrationality.

Alexei Navalny repeatedly used the nickname "grandpa in his bunker" in relation to Vladimir Putin. For example, on 22 June 2020, he used this nickname in relation to Putin in his blog, where he said that the state spent almost 1 billion rubles on a parade, not counting the costs from the military budget: "Buy medicine for pensioners with this money… This is the last thing their thoughts are occupied with the parade. But the bunker grandpa wants a parade, he needs to show off on the podium". In October 2020, the politician used the nickname "bunker grandpa" by posting a screenshot on his Instagram page with a list of the most viewed videos on his YouTube channel. In February 2021, during his detention, Navalny used nicknames in the Khimki city court to describe Putin, such as "toad sitting on a pipe", "thieving bunker grandpa", and "bunker grandpa". The Washington Post editor Robyn Dixon writes that "Navalny, a master of the catchphrase, dubs Putin "grandpa in his bunker", portraying him as hypocritical and corrupt".

As Meduza notes, Putin is called "grandpa" not "because of his physiological age or state of health", as Boris Yeltsin used to be, "and not only out of a desire to offend". The "Grandfather, take your pills" meme essentially means the same as the "OK boomer" meme: values and ideas, the human mentality were formed half a century ago in a completely different world, and they do not fit the modern order, they are outdated.

Journalist Sergei Medvedev notes that "the meme about the clumsy bunker grandpa" is born because of "the conflict between grandfathers and grandchildren", as political scientist Ekaterina Shulman said, and this is precisely the real difference in value and style: not even between TV and Facebook, but between TV and TikTok.

== See also ==
- Party of crooks and thieves
- Putin khuylo!
- Putler
- Stalin's bunker (disambiguation)
