= Fahrerbunker =

Nazi air raid shelter in Berlin, Germany

The Fahrerbunker is an air raid shelter located near the Reich Chancellery in Berlin, Germany.

The bunker was part of a subterranean bunker complex constructed in two phases in 1936 and 1944. The bunker was used as a garage for Nazi leaders vehicles, and was closely linked to the nearby Führerbunker. In mid-1990, Pink Floyd performed at the Potsdamer Platz in a celebration of the fall of the Berlin Wall. During preparations for the concert, workers found the fully intact Fahrerbunker, still furnished. The bunker notably featured propaganda artwork featuring SS officers. The bunker was left intact and sealed shut.
