= Metro-2 =

Secret metro line below Moscow between Russian government facilities

Coordinates: 55°41′17″N 37°30′48″E

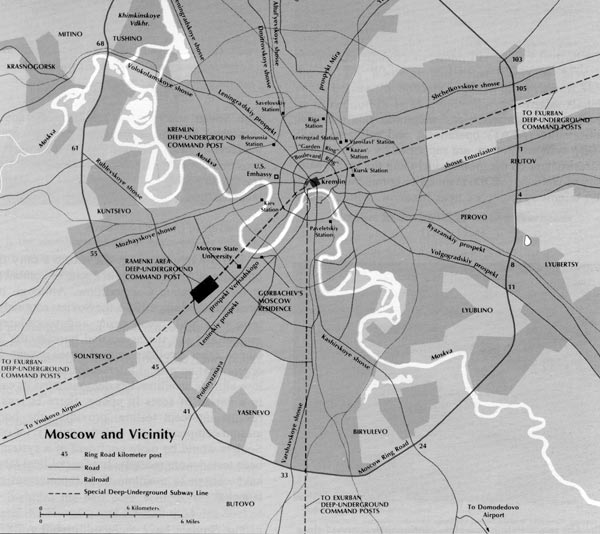
Map of the Metro-2 system as supposed by the United States military intelligence.

Metro-2 (Russian: Метро-2) is the informal designation for a clandestine and officially-unacknowledged deep underground metro system in the Moscow metropolitan area. It was designed to provide the Soviet leadership with secure wartime evacuation routes, communication hubs, and command posts, including a dedicated bunker for the national command authority. One such bunker is located beneath the Kremlin.

The system was supposedly built, or at least started, during the time of Joseph Stalin and was codenamed D-6 (Д-6) by the KGB. It is supposedly still operated by the Main Directorate of Special Programmes and Ministry of Defence.

Metro-2 is said to have four lines which lie 50–200 metres (160–660 ft) deep. It is said to connect the Kremlin with the Federal Security Service (FSB) headquarters, the government airport at Vnukovo-2, and an underground town at Ramenki, in addition to other locations of national importance. In 1994, the leader of an urban exploration group, the Diggers of the Underground Planet, claimed to have found an entrance to this underground system.

Historic evidence however paints a much more conservative picture, with one "line" existing by the late 1960s, from the Kremlin, specifically site 103, to the site 54 south from Moscow State University, with a spur going north-west from there, to the area of the Matveevskaya railway platform and the DV-1 there. Additional lines, i.e. to Vnukovo, are likely a later invention by the enthusiast community, though with the change in generations of the hardened protective structure design in the 1970/80s a redundant back up of this system may have been at least considered. The Vnukovo line, supposed to be built for government emergency evacuation, connected to the Vnukovo International Airport respectively, when originally built, was an airport originally used for military operations during the Second World War but became a civilian facility after the war. Another supposed line, the Ismaylovo line, was apparently built for Strategic Rocket forces and claimed to be at least partially destroyed in the 1970s.

== Etymology ==
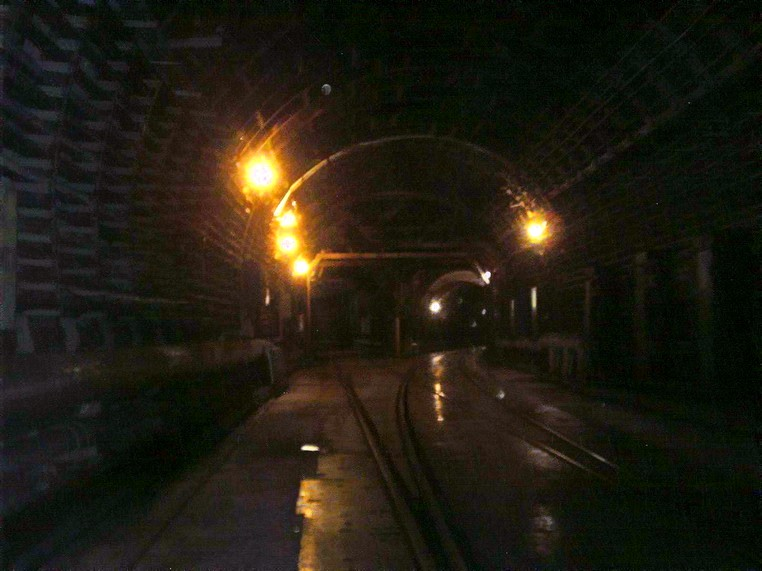
Supposedly a tunnel switch that leads to Metro-1 from Metro-2, which was in reality a switch at Troparovo to a buffer stop, on Metro-1.

In the summer of 1992, the literary and journalistic magazine Yunost (Russian: Юность) published a novel by the author and screenwriter Vladimir Gonik entitled Preispodniaia (Russian: Преисподняя) (English: Abyss), set in an underground bunker in Moscow. Earlier, in the spring of that year, excerpts from the novel had been published in the weekly newspaper Sovershenno sekretno. In an interview with both the newspaper's editor and Gonik in 1993, the author stated that the term "Metro-2" had been introduced to them, and that the novel had been written based on information collected over the previous 20 years by the two of them on things such as secret bunkers and the underground railways connecting them. Gonik admitted that he had worked on the book between 1973 and 1986, and that some of the more sensitive information had been purposefully misrepresented.

In later years, Gonik has argued that the bunkers, and therefore the so-called "Metro-2", had been for use by the leadership of the Politburo and the Communist Party of the Soviet Union (CPSU), along with their families, in case of war. According to him, in the early 1970s the General Secretary of the CPSU, Leonid Brezhnev, personally visited the main bunker, and, in 1974, awarded the Chairman of the KGB at the time, Yuri Andropov, the Gold Star Medal of the Hero of Socialist Labour. Apparently, each member of the Central Committee had a 180 m^{2} (1,900 sq ft) apartment, with a study, lounge, kitchen and bathroom. Gonik claims to have gathered this information working as a doctor in the polyclinic of the Ministry of Defence.

After the publication of the novel in 1992, the subject of a second, secret, underground railway has been raised many times, especially in the Russian media. In particular, the magazine Ogoniok (Russian: Огонёк) has referred to a "Metro-2" several times.

== Confirmed information ==
Russian journalists have reported that the existence of Metro-2 is neither confirmed nor denied by the FSB or the Moscow Metro administration. However, listed below is evidence for the Metro-2's existence.

=== Studies of declassified Soviet archival materials ===
In 2021, a book by Dmitry Yurkov was published which covered new research on the history of special fortification in Moscow. Below is a summary of findings.

From declassified archival documents, an overall layout of the track system and its main components can be established for the late 1960s (this is limited by the source material officially released so far). While the system was eventually assembled in the late 1960s by the KGB, originally it was a collection of structures built for a variety of purposes and operators.

==== Deep single-track tunnel ====
This is the oldest component of Metro-2. Construction began in the mid-1950s, and its design was finalized in 1956. It intended to provide a solution to the challenge of extending the red line southwest, beyond the Sportivnaya metro station and the river. Because of the conflicting requirements - a reasonable cost, a secure river crossing, and a civil defence shelter capacity - the final design included a shallow metro line with a vulnerable bridge backed up by a deep single track tunnel - which spurs from the main line after the Sportivnaya station (the initial part of this spur is seen on normal track maps) - and a high-speed elevator shaft.

Originally, there were also other intended peacetime uses, such as nighttime train parking.

==== Order 10-A ====
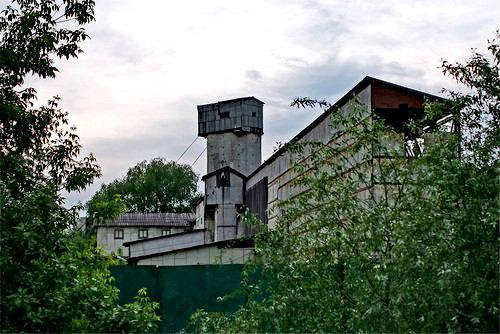
A shaft R6 of OAO "TransInzhStroy" in Ramenki

Order 10-A is composed out of sites 54 and 54a and was intended to provide protected work spaces for the personnel of the planned Palace of the Soviets behind the Moscow State University campus. The plans for those administrative buildings were tied to the shafts and other features of this underground infrastructure project but the project was never completed.

Order 10-A was made by the 9th directorate of the Ministry for Defence, and for it a new construction organization (US 10-A, presently Transinzhstroi) was set up in 1955. Construction was started in 1956 and completed by 1963.

Site 54 is composed of at least 5 shafts (1, 2, 3, 5, 6 explicitly mentioned) and includes extensive supporting systems such as air filtering stations and power generation, with the latter designed to support the planned above-ground administrative complex in case of emergencies. The site is connected to the deep single track tunnel at the depth of 189m. Shaft R6, which was used during order 10-A construction, still exists in Moscow and is a marker for its overall location.

==== Sites 100, 101, 103 and "Branch" ====
External image
- Photos of Metro-2 line ("Branch", deep single-track tunnel)

Site 103 is a large U-shaped structure built in central Moscow, designed to enhance the legacy World War II infrastructure by providing: site 1A in Kremlin (at the depth of 55m), a protected work spaces for the leadership; site 15N, a communications node; site 100 shelter (passing under site 101), a protected work spaces for the KGB. There were links to the existing legacy structures such as sites 25 and 25/2 in Kremlin, and site 201 at Lubyanka. It is also connected to the post-war site 101 at Zaryadie, which was intended to provide protected work spaces for officials working in the 8th Stalin's skyscraper; however, the skyscraper was never built, so site 101 was repurposed to support local Moscow region officials.

However, this project was plagued with a number of problems, such as slow construction (which went well into the mid-1960s), and uncertainty of how it could be evacuated after a nuclear attack. The latter was solved by the construction of "Branch" (Russian: Ветка), which linked site 103 in the city center to the deep single track tunnel and enabled moving people to the city outskirts.

==== The remote air intake (DV) network ====
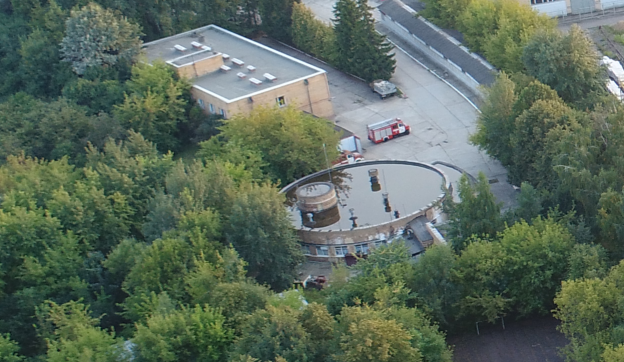
A surface building of Matveevsky air intake (DV-1) with ventilation shafts

After some initial work on a network of air filtering and then air regeneration stations, such as site 703 (aka ChZ-703), the decision was made to shift towards using several large air filtering stations on the outskirts of the city and pumping this clean air into the rest of the deep metro from there. Those were quite large structures (600,000–800,000 m^{3}/h productivity) and required extensive supporting infrastructure of their own.

While five remote air intakes were planned in Moscow, this was later cut to three, with only two actually being built: "Matveevsky" (DV-1) and "Rizhsky" (DV-2). While the latter was neatly connected to the post-war deep metro line, the former used a proprietary air supply tunnel connecting its location at the Matveevskaya railroad platform to the deep single track tunnel. This air supply tunnel was later retrofitted with track, and joined the network. For construction of this air supply tunnel and other related structures, shaft R6 was transferred from US 10-A.

A related additional structure was the special connector line between the red and circle lines, as it would allow transport of air from the deep and nuclear hardened post-war section of the red line to the similarly protected circle line, bypassing the vulnerable area of the red line, which was built in the 1930s. DV-1 could also have been be used as an evacuation exit for the Moscow Metro, due to its location in the city outskirts at the time.

Leningrad also received a remote air intake, located at Lenin's square.

==== Move to KGB custody ====
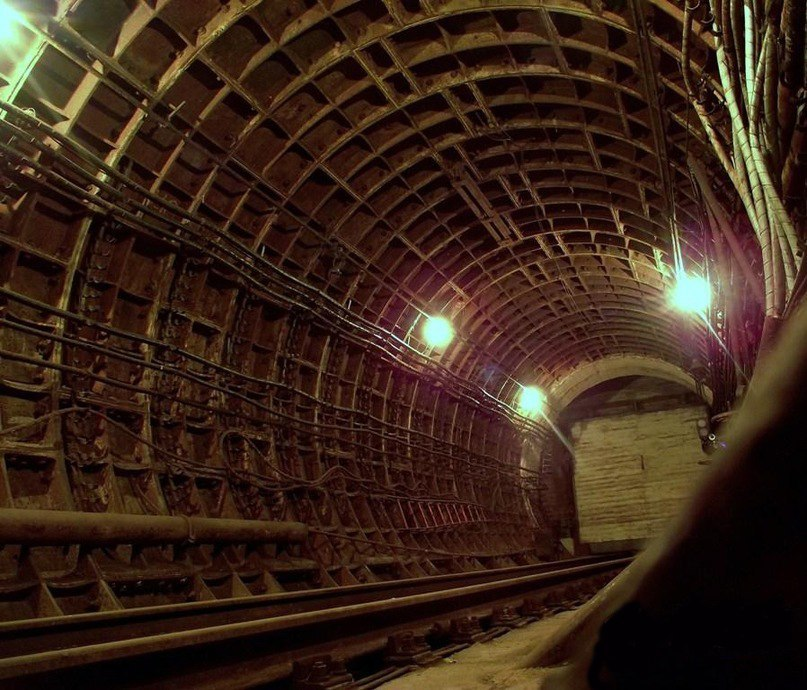
A hermetic gate in a deep single track tunnel that separates Metro-1 from Metro-2, which was built after transferring this tunnel to KGB

In the late 1960s, the DV-1 and its related support infrastructure (i.e. the deep single track tunnel) were transferred to the KGB from the Moscow Metro, with a number of modifications being made, such as reworking the deep single track tunnel connection to the red line and adding a hardened hangar for 10 APCs at the DV-1.

==== Possible causes of the naming confusion and myth generation ====
DV (Russian: ДВ) is quite similar to D6 (Д6), and may be one of the ways this designation came to be used in modern online discussions. The so-called "underground city in Ramenki" is likely the result of urban explorers observing extensive support infrastructure for the DV-1. Alternatively, this term has also been linked to the order 10-A (i.e. with the CIA map drawing a large rectangular box with the known shaft R6 in the center).

=== Report from the U.S. Department of Defense ===
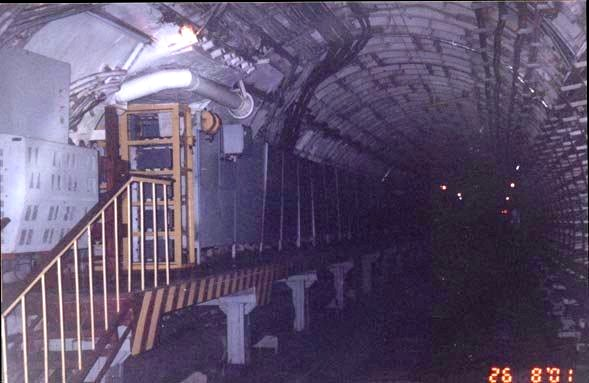
An underground service platform that is supposedly part of Metro-2

In 1991, the United States Department of Defense published a report entitled Military forces in transition, which devoted several pages to a secret government underground in Moscow. It also included a diagram of the system superimposed on a map of the city.

"The Soviets have constructed deep-underground both in urban Moscow and outside the city. These facilities are interconnected by a network of deep interconnected subway lines that provide a quick and secure means of evacuation for the leadership. The leadership can move from their peacetime offices through concealed entryways in protective quarters beneath the city. There are important deep-underground command posts in the Moscow area, one located at the Kremlin. Soviet press has noted the presence of an enormous underground leadership bunker adjacent to Moscow State University. These facilities are intended for the national command authority in wartime. They are estimated to be between 200 m (660 ft) and 300 m (980 ft) deep, and can accommodate an estimated 10,000 people. A special subway line runs from some points in Moscow and possibly to the VIP terminal at Vnukovo Airfield(...)"

—Military forces in transition, 1991, p. 40

=== Information from officials ===
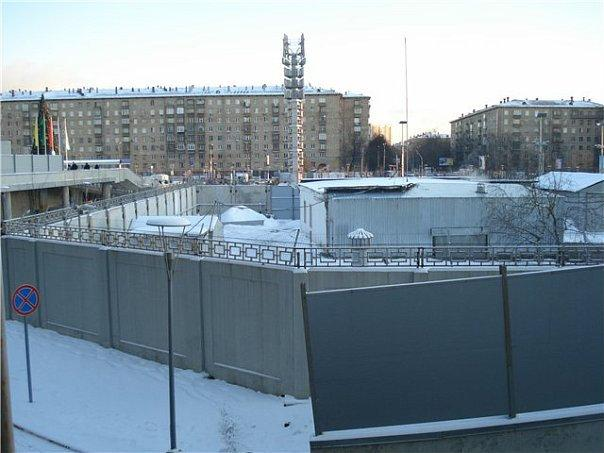
A structure that appears to be a secret ventilation complex near the Moscow State University, University metro station and site 54

==== Igor Malashenko ====
In 1992, in an interview with Time, Deputy Director Broadcaster Igor Malashenko spoke about the existence of Sofrino-2, about 30 km (19 mi) to the north-east of Moscow's television broadcasting centers, built at great depths in case of nuclear war. According to Malashenko, the equipment was unusable due to age. He went on to say that the same fate befell many of the underground bomb shelters, and in particular a system of underground bunkers beneath the building of Moscow State University, which he said were flooded and had deteriorated.

==== Vladimir Shevchenko ====
In 2004, former advisor of Soviet president Mikhail Gorbachev, former Russian president Boris Yeltsin and then president Vladimir Putin, Vladimir Shevchenko confirmed the existence of a secret in the Moscow Metro.

"Reports on the number of underground communications are greatly exaggerated. In the days of Stalin, who was very afraid of assassination attempts, there was in fact a single-track underground railway line running from the Kremlin to his so-called "Nearby Dacha" in Volynskoye. Today, neither the Dacha nor the subway line are in use. In addition, there were underground transport links between the General Staff and several other government facilities. In 1991 a pneumatic mail tube was constructed between the CPSU Central Committee building in Moscow's Old Square and the Kremlin."

In 2008, Shevchenko once again touched upon the Metro-2.

"Currently, the Kremlin subway cannot be called a transportation artery, and, as far as I know, for its continued operation it required major repairs: for among other things there are a lot of underground utilities which will eventually decay."

==== Mikhail Poltoranin ====
In 2008, Mikhail Poltoranin, a minister under Boris Yeltsin in the early 1990s, explained:

"This is an extensive network of tunnels and an emergency command center in case of war, where you can command the nuclear forces of the country. It can hide a lot of people - its maintenance was necessary. I know that the "Metro-2" has branches that go to the suburbs so that the command could move away from the epicenter of a nuclear attack."

==== Dmitry Gayev ====
When ex-chief of the Moscow Metro Dmitry Gayev was questioned on the existence of the Metro-2, he responded:

"I would be surprised if it did not exist."

In the same year, in an interview with Izvestia, he said:

"There is a lot of talk about the existence of secret transport tunnels. I will not deny anything. I would be surprised if they did not exist. You ask: Can we use them to transport passengers? It is not for me to decide, but for those organizations who own the railways. I do not exclude such a possibility."

==== Svetlana Razina ====
In 2008, in an interview in Argumenty i Fakty, the head of the Moscow Metro independent trade union, Svetlana Razina, admitted:

"Several years ago, among the drivers of the Izmailovo depot there was a recruiting for a service on secret routes, and although there were many willing, they were to select only one. Entering the midst of these tunnels is only for people with special clearance. Most often, these branches used very short trains, consisting of battery-electric locomotive and one passenger car."

==== ITAR-TASS ====
As stated in a report of ITAR-TASS in 2007:

"Line of the Metro-2 has long been in the KGB office, and subsequently came under the wing of the FSB."

=== Information from defectors ===
==== Oleg Gordievsky ====
Oleg Gordievsky, a former colonel of the KGB who worked for the British Secret Intelligence Service (MI6) for 11 years and defected in 1985, in an interview with Argumenty i Fakty called The supreme secret of the KGB, which has not been disclosed until now stated

"You still do not know the main KGB secret yet: a huge underground city, a whole communications network of such facilities. But they will not show you; they will never, of course."

=== Declassified facilities ===
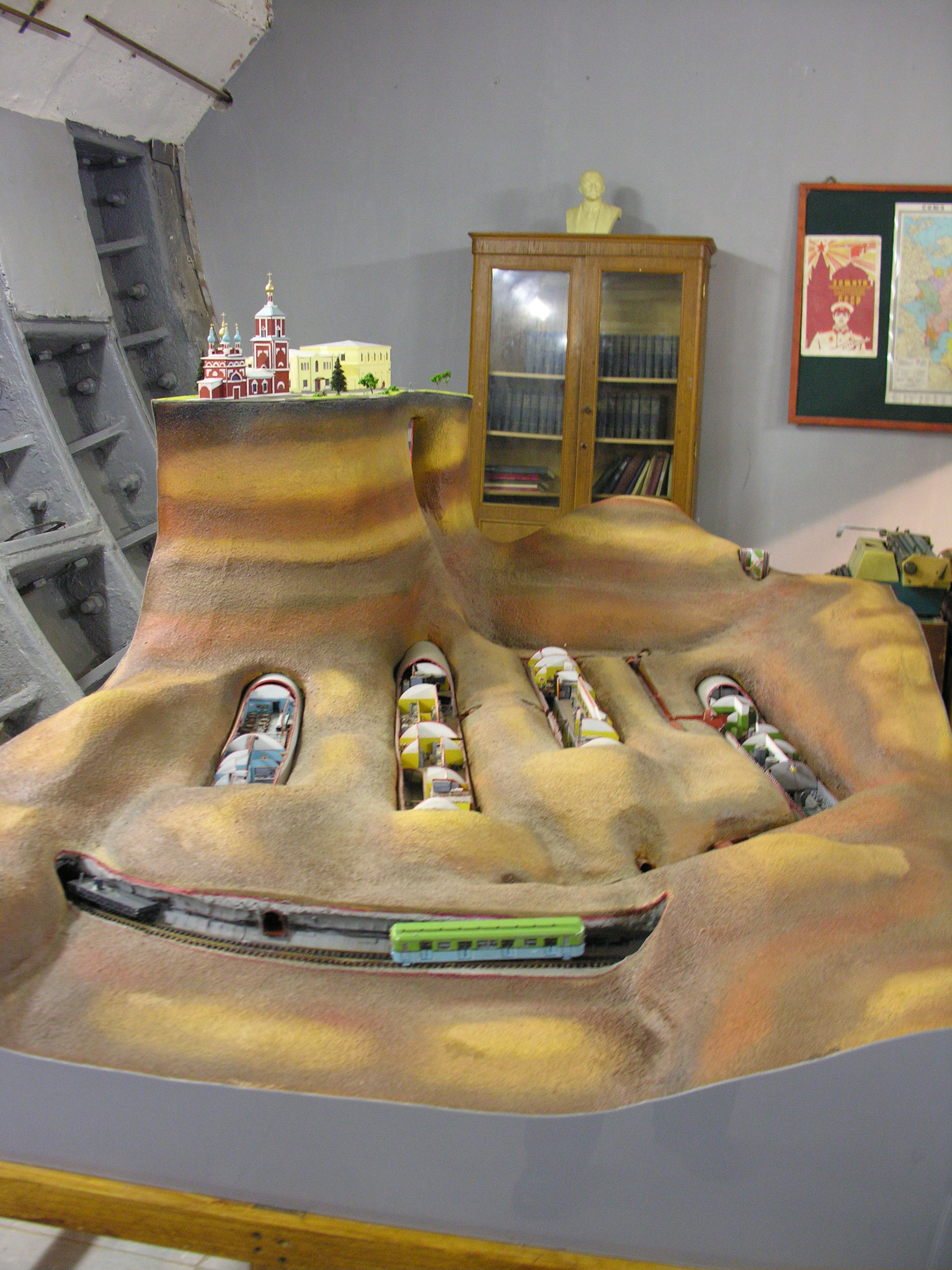
Model of the underground facility RFQ "Tagan".

==== Museum of the Cold War ====
In 2006, the Museum of the Cold War was opened to the public, located in the old Tagansky Protected Command Point. Also known as "Bunker-42" this museum is located at the GO-42 site, that took over sites 02 and 20. Site 02 was a deeply buried hardened protective structure housing a secure telephone exchange, while site 20 was some sort of military communications node (little hard archival evidence exists beyond that).

Sites 02 and 20 were connected to the regular Metro, with site 02 forming a ring of hardened telephone exchanges together with sites 01 (close to Belorusskaya metro station) and 03 (close to Kievskaya metro station). None of those sites were physically connected to the "Metro-2".

==== Special fortification museum ====
In 2018, a museum opened at the location of the former ministry for foreign affairs secure archive facility ("Bunker-703, also known as MFA site 2 or ChZ-703) . Around 42 meters deep, it was originally intended as a metro air filtering, then air regeneration station, before the metro began work on a remote air intake network.

== "Underground City" in Ramenki ==
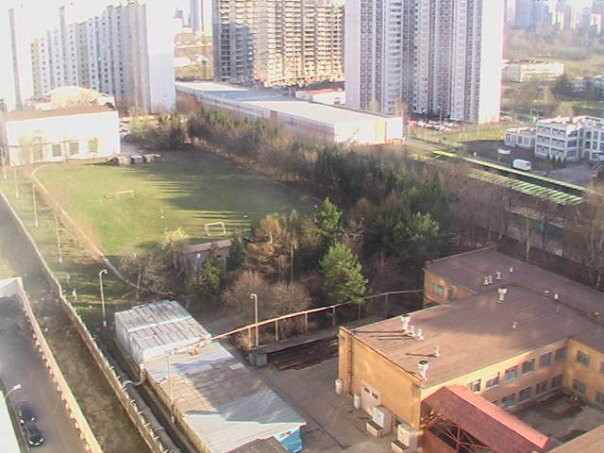
A highly secured complex of buildings near Ramenki metro station between sites 54 and DV-1 air intake that appears to be an entrance to underground city in Ramenki and station of "Branch"

In southwest Moscow, near the Ramenki District, there is a vacant lot to the southwest of the main building of Moscow State University. A complex of buildings of the research base of Association "Science" (NEBO "Nauka"), built to a depth of between 180 m (590 ft) and 200 m, is the largest underground bunker in Moscow. According to the same source, it is connected with other secret underground facilities, and appears to be able to house up to 15,000 people. A complex of surface buildings was built by architect Eugene Rozanov in 1975 by order of Glavspetsstroy.

One of the first times the facility was mentioned was in Time in 1992. Its article refers to a source named a "KGB officer", who claims he took part in the construction of a large underground facility in Ramenki. It was claimed construction began in the mid-1960s and was complete by mid-1970. The facility was named by the journalist as the "Underground City", which was supposedly intended to give refuge to 15,000 people for 30 years in the event of a nuclear attack on Moscow.

Most likely this is the sites 54, 54a of the order 10-A due to the location, time of construction (1956–1962), depth (189m at the connection to the deep single track tunnel) matching. The inflated numbers for the shelter capacity may be influenced by the original deep single track tunnel's civil defence mission, which was to provide additional capacity to the metro. However, despite the high capacity, this was only a temporary, short term shelter, much like the other civil defence infrastructure.

In the media, the "Underground City" is often referred to as "Ramenki-43", the address of one of the supposed entrances to the facility. Ostensibly, the address is home to Militarized Rescue Squad 21 and the 1st Paramilitary Rescue Squad.

== Rolling stock ==
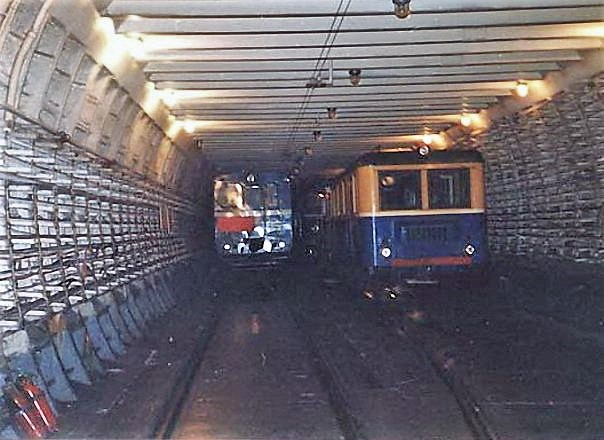
A diesel multiple unit DPS (left) and railcar AS1A (right) in the tunnel of Moscow Metro-2 («Branch»)

In the Branch system, due to the absence of a third rail, a special diesel and battery-electric rolling stock was used. All this rolling stock is on the balance sheet of military base 95006 (Special Objects Service of Main Directorate of Special Programs of the President of the Russian Federation), which is located in the Ramenki District near DV-1 air intake. By order of this military unit, the Moscow Metro carries out maintenance and repair of the rolling stock of the Branch, for which it is temporarily transferred to the civil metro depots through the deep single track tunnel. Also, by order of this military unit, the training and production center of the Moscow metro provides training for metro train drivers.

The known rolling stock of the Branch system includes:

- AS1A — a small gasoline-powered railcars, which are basically used on conventional railways to transport railroad workers. It is known that at the Branch were used at least two such railcars with numbers 1198 and 1401, which were produced by Velikoluksky Plant in 1971 and 1972, but now they are taken away from service and moved to a conventional metro depot where they are preserved.
- Ezh6 (model 81-712) — a subversion of the standard passenger electric subway cars Ezh3 (model 81-710), produced by Metrowagonmash, adapted for operation in conjunction with battery-electric locomotives of type L. Each train of the Branch was formed of two Ezh6 cars and one or two L electric locomotives in the middle of the train. Totally 10 subway cars were built - 6 in 1973 and 4 in 1986. As of the end of the 2010s, there were two modified cars EZh6M left in the Branch system, operating with a diesel-electric locomotive LM, the others were scrapped or moved to operate with Ezh3 cars in conventional subway trains.
- L (model 81-711) — a battery electric locomotives with two control cabins, designed for joint operation with Ezh6 cars. Totally 6 electric locomotives were built - 3 in 1974 and 3 in 1986. As of the end of the 2010s, one electric locomotive was converted into a diesel-electric locomotive and remained in operation under the LM type designation, the others were scrapped in 2009 or before.
- DPS — a special four-car diesel-hydraulic multiple unit for transporting metro workers. The only one train of this type was built in 1995 at the Lyudinovsky plant and later modernized at the Metrovagonmash plant before being sent to the Moscow Metro. The train arrived to serve the Branch, however its current fate is unknown.
- RA1 730.15 — a modification of the RA1 model 730 diesel-hydraulic passenger railcar for conventional railways, which, in turn, was created on the basis of the passenger metro car 81-720. This railcar is designed for transportation of subway employees or other special persons. Produced by the Metrovagonmash plant from 2003, the exact number of cars is unknown, but at least 7 cars were produced. It is also known that in the late 2000s, by order of military base 95006, its cars were repaired.
- 81-730.05 — a cargo-passenger diesel-hydraulic railcar. Two railcars were produced in 2008. It has both a passenger compartment with two control cabins and side automatic doors, and also an open flat platform for cargo with a loading crane. It is also known that in the late 2000s, by order of military base 95006, these cars were repaired. Note that the side doors are leaning-sliding (when opened, they move towards the cabin) and are similar in design to the cabin doors of the metro trains 81-740/741 “Rusich”, while passenger doors are based on the 81-717/714 series and turn inward when opened. It also sports a colour palette similar to the 81-720/721 "Yauza" series. Inside the cabin, opposite the end door on the right side, there is a door to enter the salon.
- Oka diesel railcar (its exact model designation is unknown) — a two-cabin diesel-hydraulic railcar, which is a conversion of the passenger electric subway car 81-760 Oka. Like railcars 730.15, it is designed for transportation of subway employees and other special persons and has only one pair of the automatic doors in the center instead of four pair of doors which standard cars Oka has. It is known that at least one car was produced in 2016.
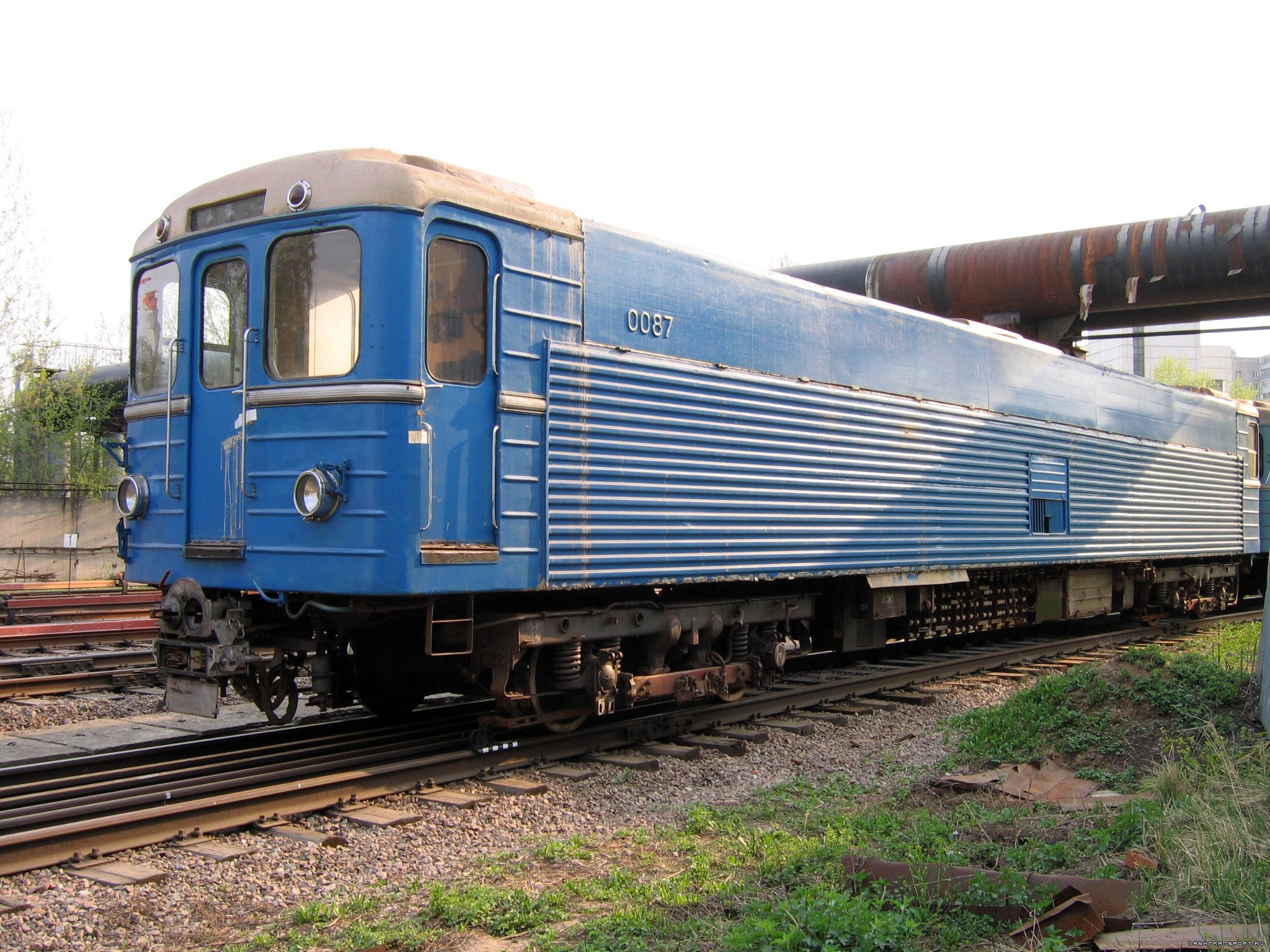
L battery-electric locomotive

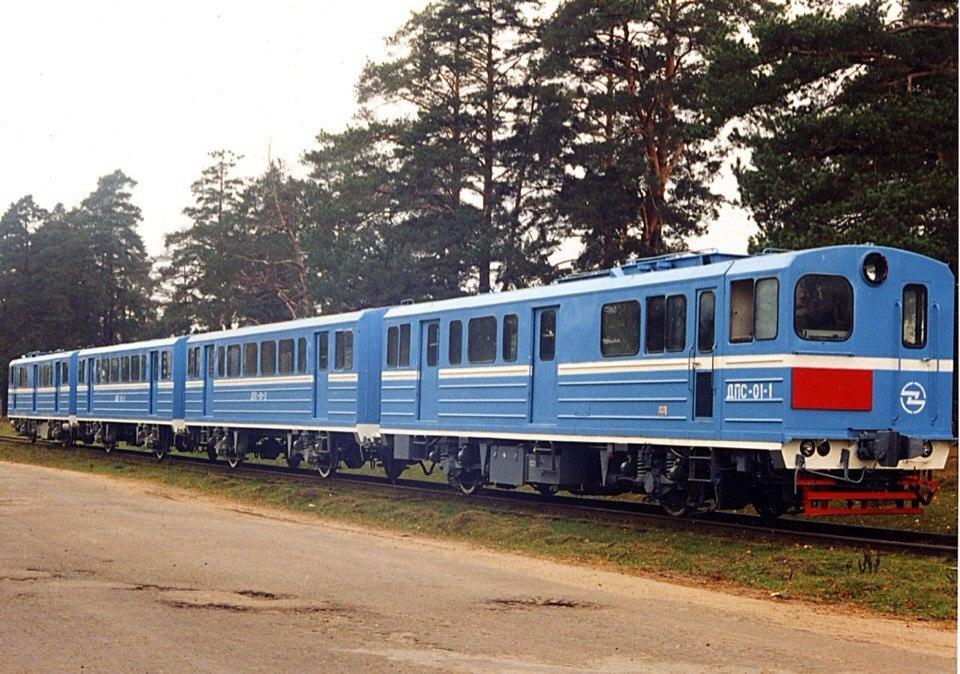
DPS-01 DMU

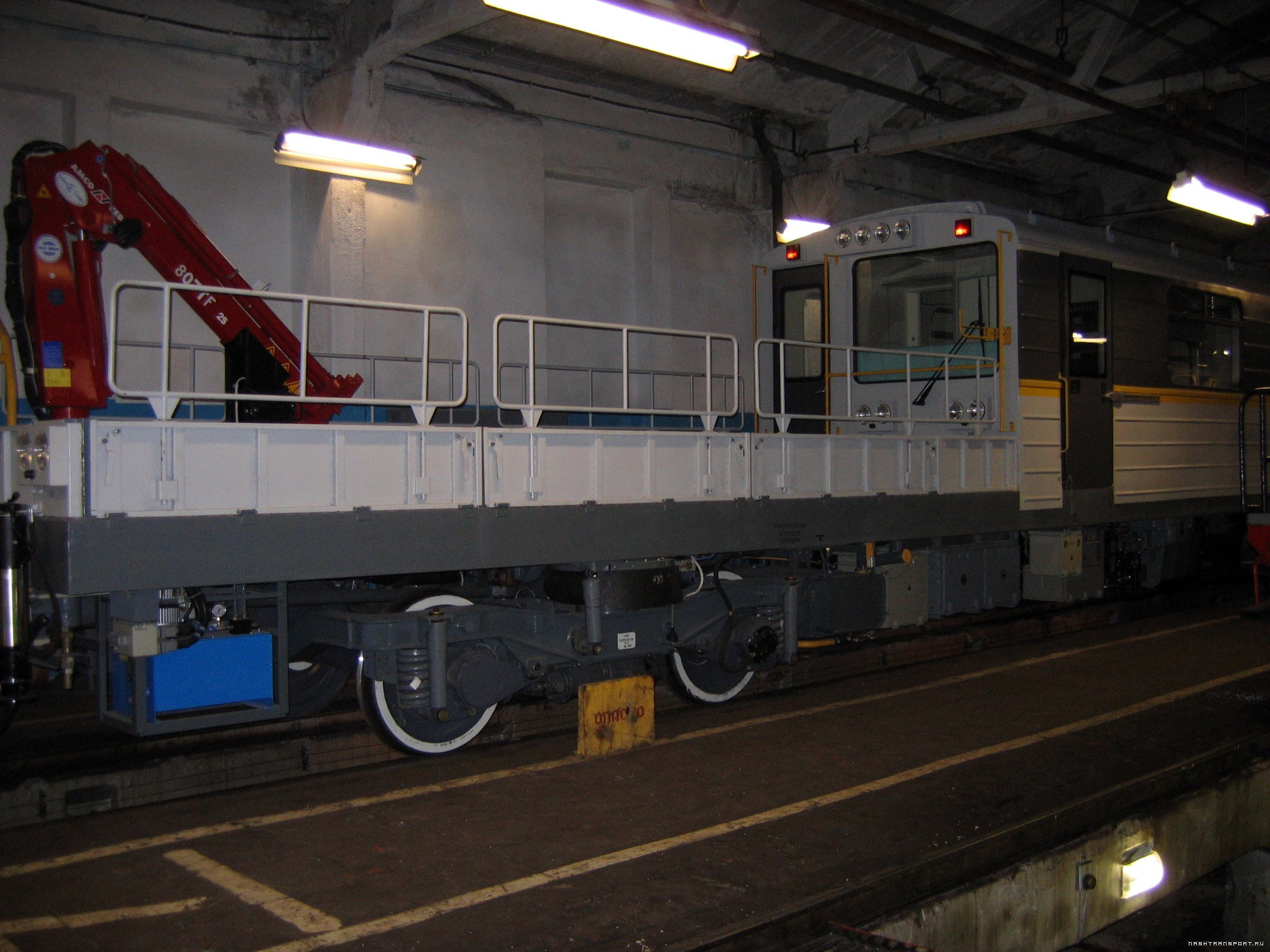
81-730.05 freight and passenger railcar

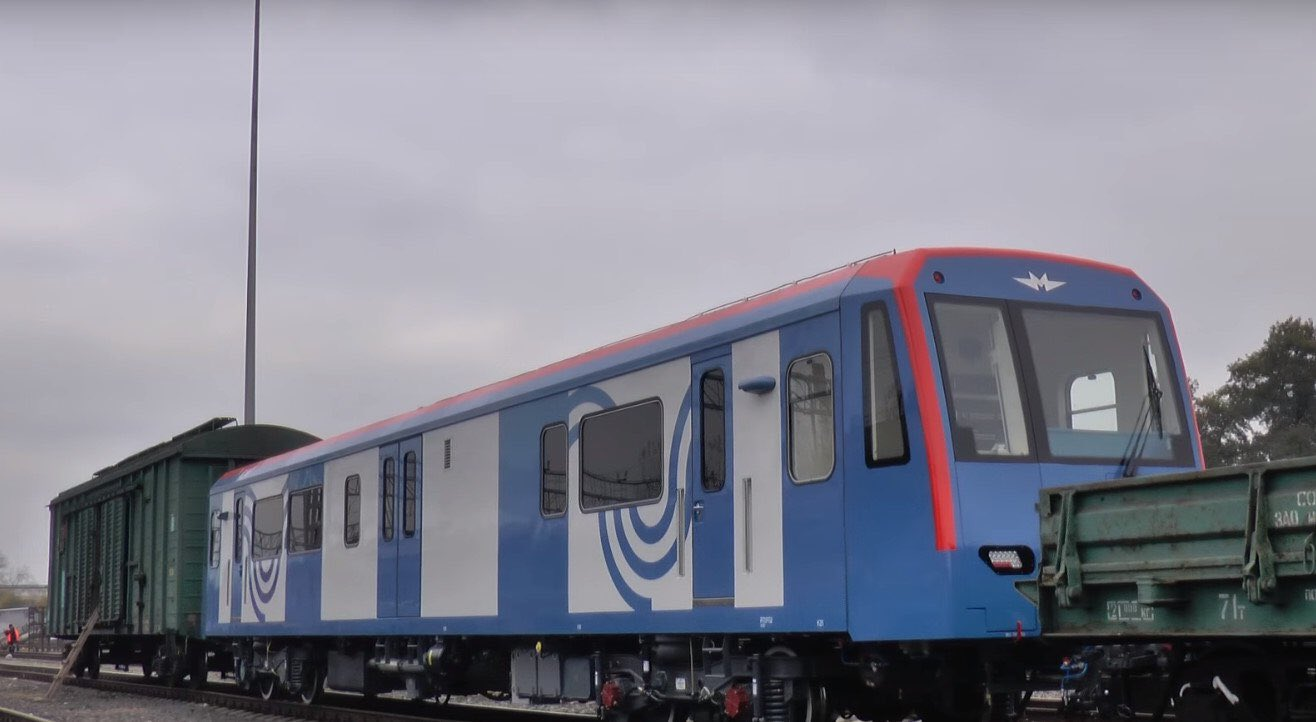
A diesel railcar based on 81-760
