= Stalin's bunker =

Stalin's bunker may refer to:

- Stalin's bunker, Samara
- Informal name for Tagansky Protected Command Point, Moscow
- A bunker under Stalin's Kuntsevo Dacha
