= Putin khuylo! =

Slogan deriding Vladimir Putin

"Putin huylo!" (Путін — хуйло!) chant

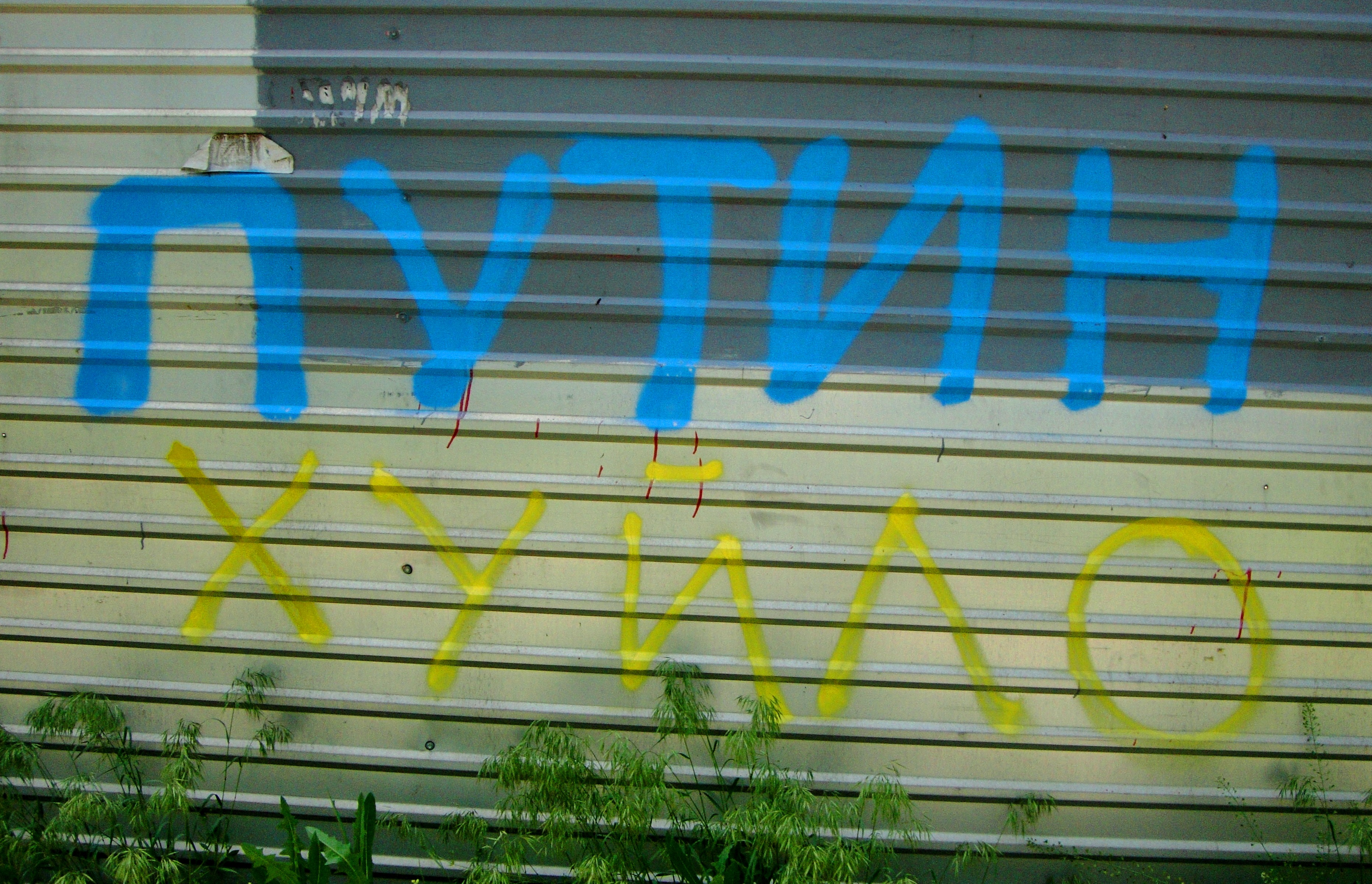
"Putin huylo!" (Путин — хуйло!) graffiti in the Ukrainian national colours, Luhansk, May 2014

"Putin – khuylo!" or "Putin – khuilo!" (Note: Russian: Путин — хуйло, romanized: Putin — khuylo, IPA: [ˈputʲɪn xʊjˈlo]; Ukrainian: Путін — хуйло, romanized: Putin — khuilo, IPA: [ˈput⁽ʲ⁾in xʊjˈlɔ]; Belarusian: Пуцін — хуйло, romanized: Putsin — khuylo, IPA: [ˈput͡sʲin xujˈlɔ].) is a slogan deriding Vladimir Putin, the president of Russia, commonly translated as "Putin [is a] dickhead!"

It originated in Ukraine in 2014, having grown from a football chant first performed by FC Metalist Kharkiv and FC Shakhtar Donetsk ultras in March 2014 at the onset of the Russo-Ukrainian War. The phrase has become a protest song and is widely spread in Ukraine amongst supporters of Ukrainian sovereignty and territorial integrity, as well as those opposing Vladimir Putin in both Russia and Ukraine.

== Etymology ==
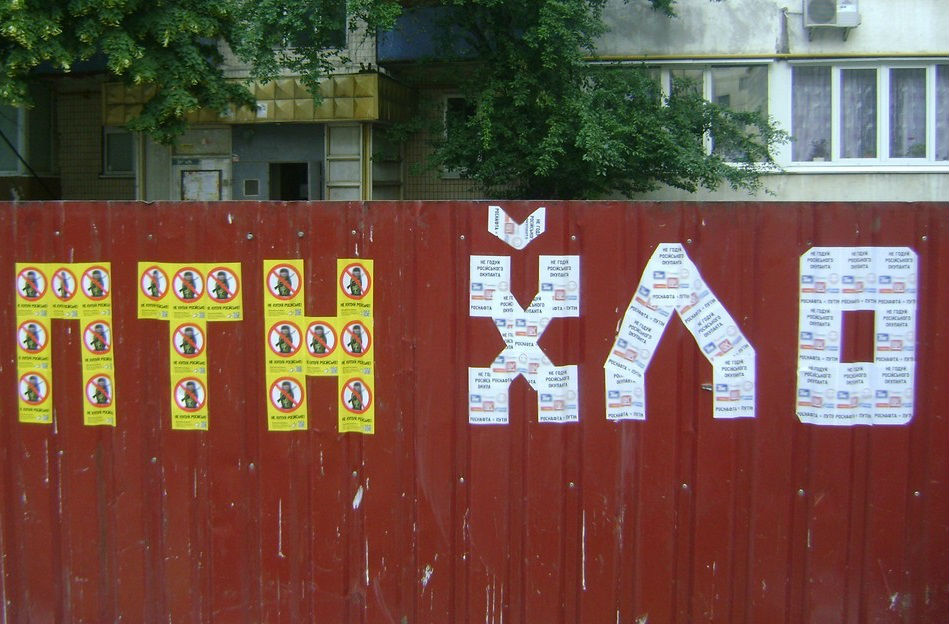
"ПТН X̆ЛО" (PTN KhLO) made of stickers "Do not buy Russian goods!". Brovary, Kyiv Oblast, June 2014

The obscene term (mat) хуйло́ is variously transliterated as huilo, huylo, khuilo, khuylo, or chujlo. Also there are dialect variants хуи́ла (huila), хуи́бла (huibla). Its core is хуй (huy), literally "penis", in both Russian and Ukrainian. Combined with the suffix -lo, it is a personal insult. It can be translated as "dickhead", but its connotation is far more pejorative in those languages than in English.

In May 2014, media outlets reported that the Russian profanity huilo had been added to the Urban Dictionary as a synonym for Vladimir Putin.

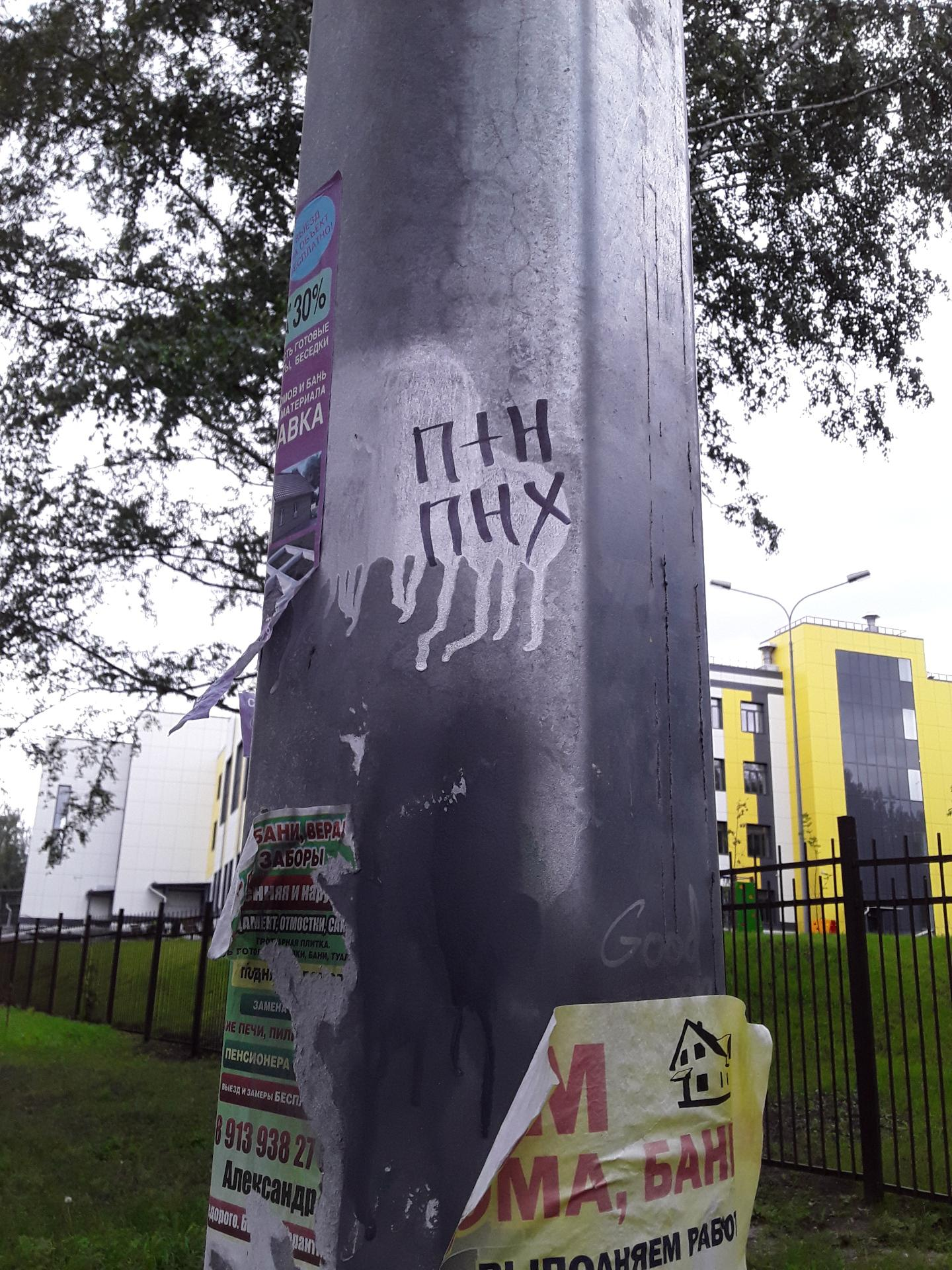
Marker graffiti "ПТН ПНХ" (PTN PNKh). "ПНХ" stands for пошёл на́ хуй (poshól ná khuy), "go fuck yourself", so the graffiti can be translated as PTN GFY, "Putin go fuck yourself"). Novosibirsk Akademgorodok, Russia, July 2022.

== Origin ==
The chant has its origins in "Surkis Khuylo!", a football chant initiated by the ultras of FC Metalist Kharkiv some time in 2010, during the height of a feud between two Ukrainian oligarchs, Oleksandr Yaroslavsky, then owner of Metalist, and Hryhoriy Surkis, then president of the Football Federation of Ukraine who had strong historic and family ties with FC Dynamo Kyiv.

The first recorded public performance of the "Putin khuylo!" chant and the song that grew from it took place in March 2014 in Kharkiv, when the local fans chanted it during their street march. The recording was soon posted to YouTube. Various groups of Ukrainian ultras of major Ukrainian clubs with the exception of FC Sevastopol have historically held strong pro-Ukrainian political views. These football fans sided with Ukraine at the onset of the Russian annexation of Crimea and military intervention, as well as during the pro-Russian unrest in the east and south of Ukraine, when the city of Kharkiv was in turmoil.

Soon, the song gained wider popularity, spreading amongst other clubs. The fans of Shakhtar Donetsk (Donetsk) and Dynamo Kyiv (Kyiv), who were formerly feuding, sang the song together. During the beginning of the Russo-Ukrainian War in 2014, in which Russia annexed Crimea from Ukraine and used proxy forces to occupy parts of the eastern Donbas region, the ultras of various Ukrainian clubs set aside their rivalries and chanted the song in joint street marches. The chant became "a nationwide cultural meme" according to The Guardian.

Artemy Troitsky identified the melody of the chant as coming from the song "Speedy Gonzales", popularised by American singer Pat Boone in 1962.

In June 2015, the Russian Federal Security Service started a criminal prosecution and investigation of activist Daria Poludova for using the song on VK. The case was dropped after Poludova's lawyer demanded a confrontation with the victim, Putin, as required by law.

When Russian television channel TNT aired one episode of the Ukrainian sitcom Servant of the People in December 2019, a scene containing a joke that referenced the song, in which the fictional president played by Volodymyr Zelenskyy asked "Putin khublo?" («Путин — хубло?») when told that Putin wore a Hublot watch, was cut out of the episode. The omission occurred only within central Russia and the Moscow region, but not in the eastern regions of Russia.

== Use ==
=== In music ===
Several Ukrainian mainstream rock music bands included or adapted the chant into their music. A metal remix, released in April 2014 by AstrogentA, added instrumentation and reworked the video of the 30 March protest chant to depict its spread throughout Ukrainian football clubs.

In May 2014, the Ukrainian band Teleri released a song and a video titled "Putin Hello!" Their song uses a double entendre, substituting the objectionable word "khuylo" with the English word "Hello!" Alluding to the "Putin huylo!" chant, the video features band players wearing Ukrainian football club colors and posing as ultras marching and chanting "Putin Hello" as the refrain of the song. The band members asserted, tongue-in-cheek, that the linking of their song to an offensive anti-Putin chant was a misunderstanding and insisted that the only people who found the chant objectionable were Russians unfamiliar with English.

Hromadske.TV aired a live performance of the song by Lemonchiki Project in May 2014. The rock band Druha Rika performed the song at their concert in June 2014. Other rock adaptations were made by Mad Heads and Haydamaky. The Kyiv Post reviewed nine video versions of the song and two other related songs.

=== In sport ===
In October 2014, Belarusians joined visiting Ukrainians in a performance of the chant by "nearly the entire stadium" at a UEFA Euro 2016 qualifying match in Barysaw, Belarus, resulting in more than 100 Ukrainian and 30 Belarusian football fans being detained and interrogated, reportedly on suspicion of using "obscene language". Seven, all Ukrainian, were sentenced to five days in jail for obscene language, whilst one was given a 10-day sentence for allegedly wearing a swastika.

=== In art ===
In December 2022, a statue giving a visual interpretation of "Putin khuylo" was erected in the English town of Rowley Regis, but by 5 February 2023 it had been removed.

=== In the US press ===
- The Washington Post
- The Wall Street Journal
- The Atlantic
- Time
- Business Insider
- Bloomberg View
- International Business Times
- Newsweek

=== In politics ===
==== Oleh Lyashko ====
Oleh Lyashko, a former Ukrainian MP and leader of the country's Radical Party, performed the song in May 2014 at a public rally during his 2014 presidential campaign.

==== Andrii Deshchytsia ====
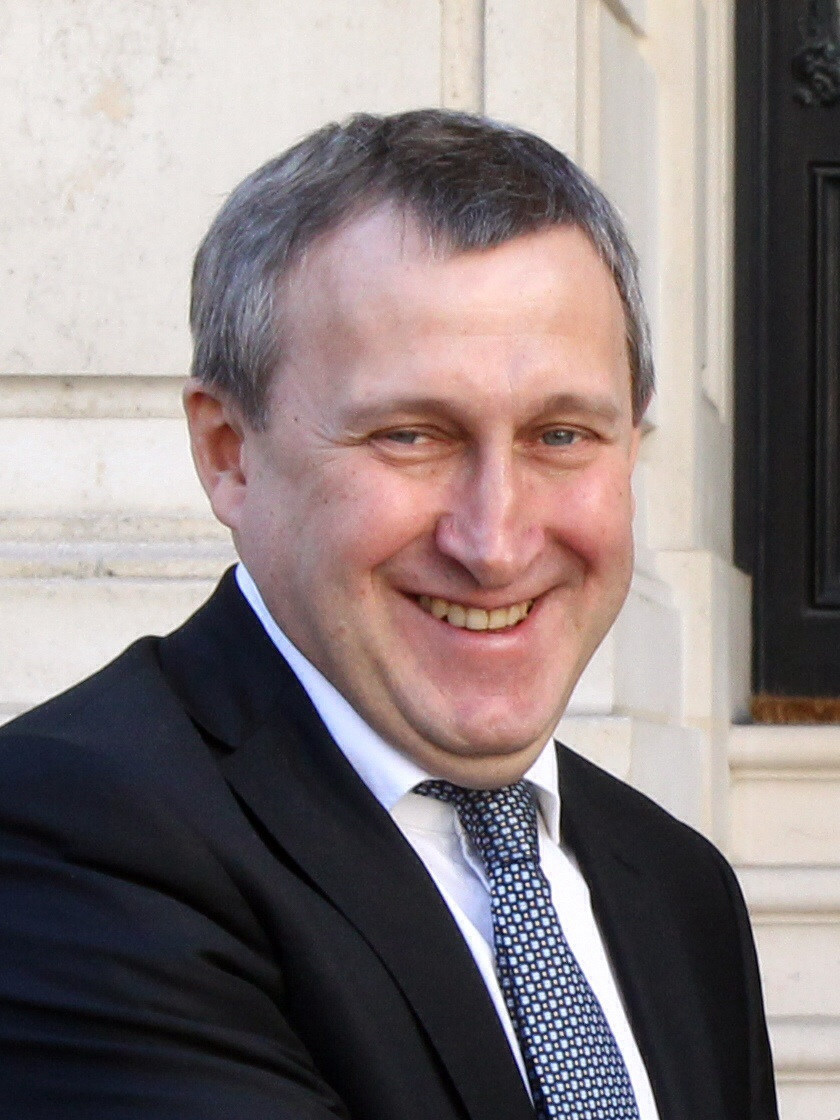
Ukrainian diplomat Andrii Deshchytsia

Hromadske.TV aired a footage showing Andrii Deshchytsia, a then Minister of Foreign Affairs of Ukraine, uttering the word "khuylo" in reference to the Russian president Putin during his plea with protesters in front of the Russian Embassy in Kyiv on the evening of 14 June 2014, following the shoot-down of a Ukrainian Air Force Ilyushin Il-76 by Russian-armed rebels. Deshchytsya pleaded the protesters to refrain from violence directed at the Embassy that would cause a bigger diplomatic scandal. Deshchytsia stated: "He (Putin) is a khuylo, but — disperse, please!".

Shortly afterward, Ukrainian president Petro Poroshenko nominated a different diplomat to lead the Foreign Affairs ministry. According to the Ukrainian media, the presidential plan to replace the minister was known prior to the incident, being proposed as part of a bigger reshuffle in the Ukrainian government. Soon after, Poroshenko praised the work of Deshchytsia, who was then leaving his ministerial position, and the parliament gave the outgoing minister a standing ovation.

Deshchytsia's use of the wording caused widespread discontent amongst the Russian leadership. However, Geoffrey Pyatt, the US ambassador to Ukraine, wrote on Twitter that minister Deshchytsia's use of the chant had been "seeking to defuse a dangerous situation", calling Deshchytsia "a skilled diplomat and credit to Ukraine."

==== Arsen Avakov ====
In July 2014, Arsen Avakov who was the Ukrainian Minister of Internal Affairs, one of the country's major security agencies, published a Facebook post with a photo he took that showed a bus stop near Sloviansk covered by a "Putin Khuilo!" graffiti. The minister's post included his comment with the picture saying: "A private opinion some place near Sloviansk. Aligning myself."

=== Russian invasion of Ukraine ===
The phrase became popular again during the Russian invasion of Ukraine. Ukrainian brewer Yuri Zastavny began preparing glass bottles to be used for anti-Russian Molotov cocktails with the English-lettered label "Putin Huylo".

Ukrainian hackers disabled electric vehicle charging stations in Russia so that instead of providing a charge, the stations display a scrolling message that includes the phrase.

== See also ==
- O1G, a similar slogan targeting Viktor Orbán
- Serzhik, go away!, a similar slogan targeting Serzh Sargsyan
- Yalla Erhal Ya Bashar, a similar chant targeting Bashar Al Assad
- Let's Go Brandon, a political euphemism for "fuck Joe Biden"
- Russian warship, go fuck yourself
- Putler
- Grandpa in his bunker
- Hang noodles on the ears
- Khuy Voyne! ("fuck war!"), a phrase used to protest the Iraq War and the Russian invasion of Ukraine
