= Tagansky Protected Command Point =

Exhibition Complex Bunker 42
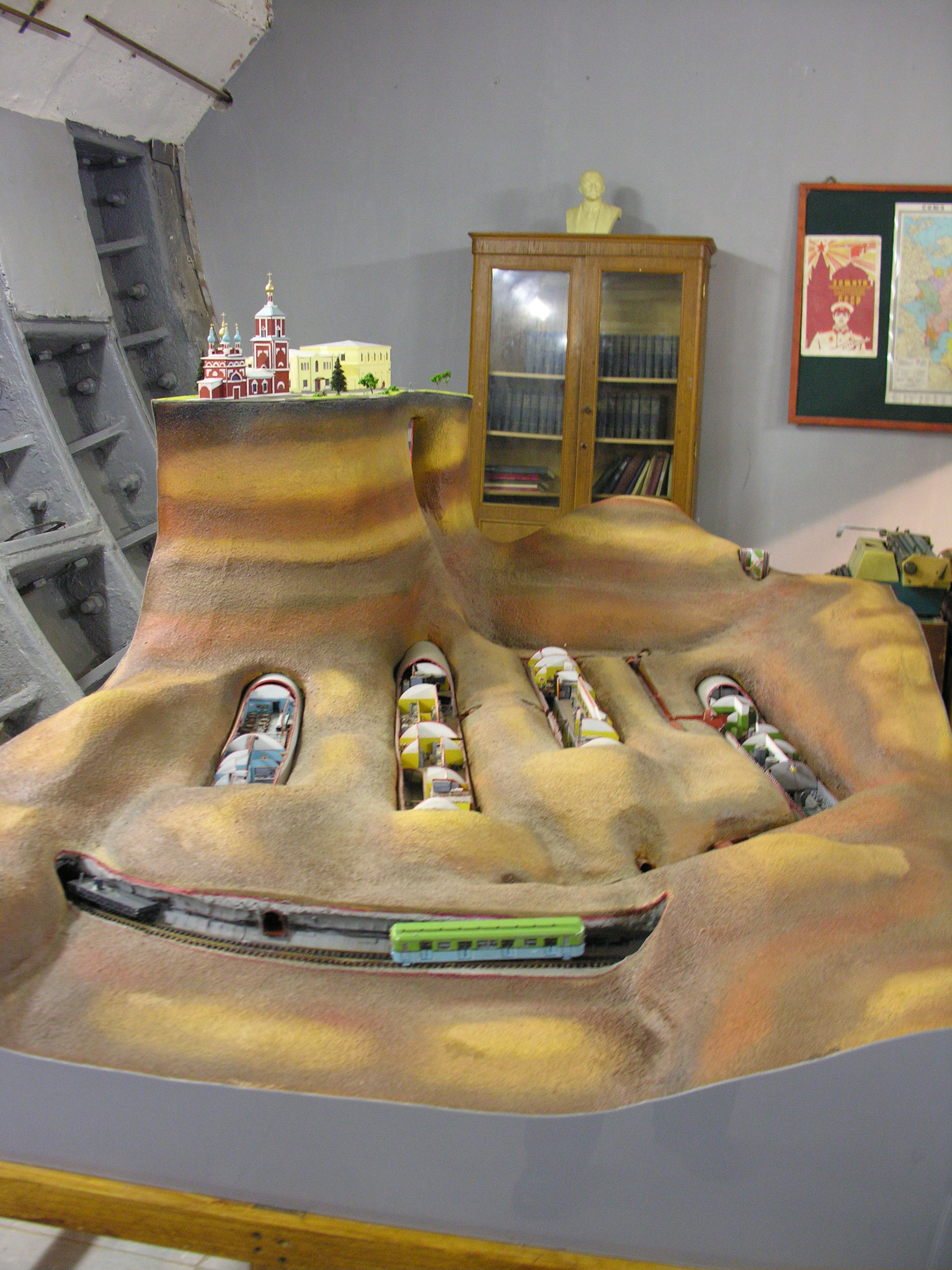
- Model of the bunker layout
- Established: 1956; 70 years ago
- Location: 115172, Moscow, 5th Kotelnichesky Lane, 11
- Coordinates: 55.741735°N 37.649277°E
- Type: Cold War Museum, restaurant
- Public transit access: Taganskaya, 5 min walk
- Website: Museum website

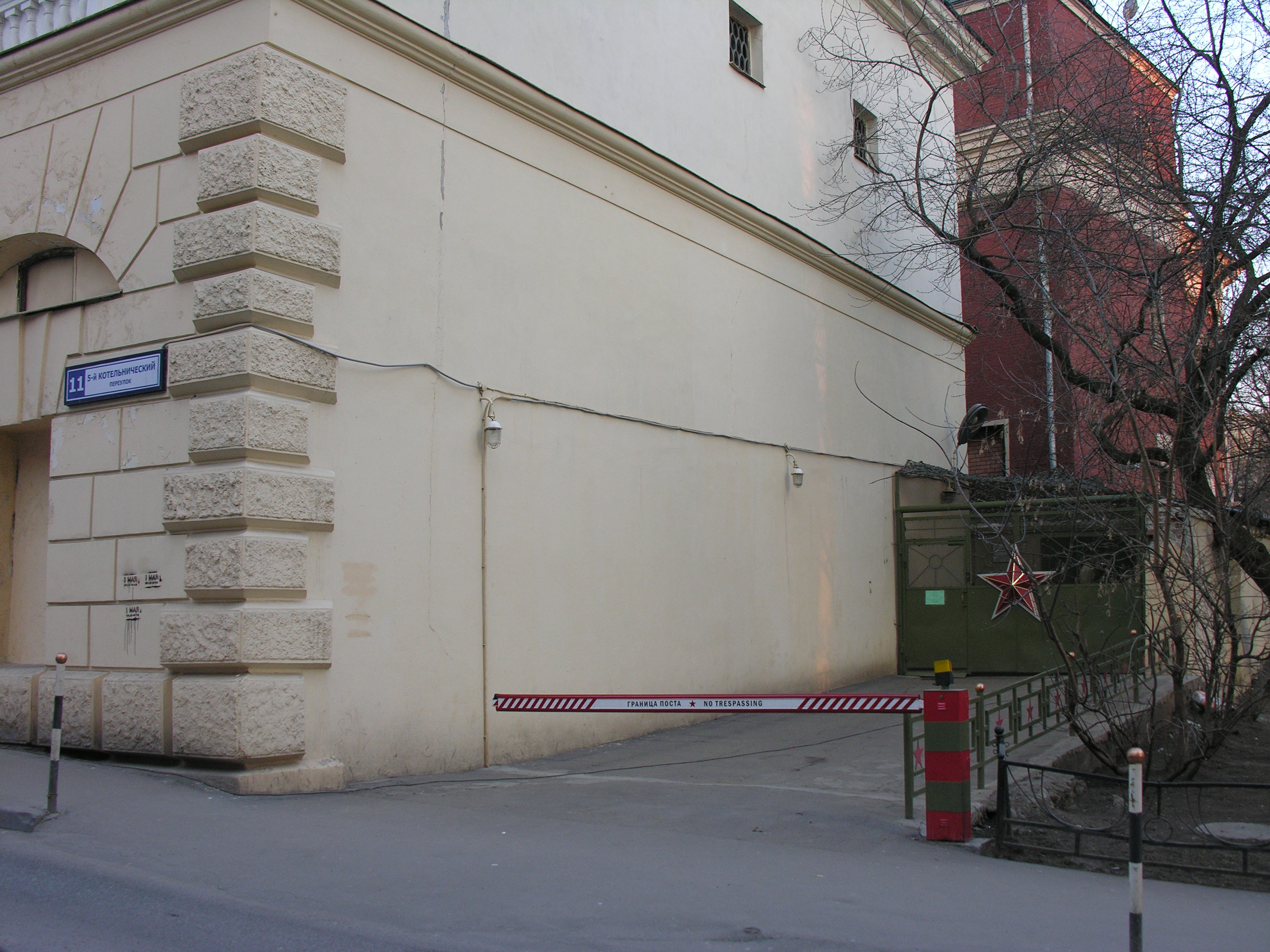
Entrance is masked as an old building

The Cold War Museum (Moscow) or Bunker GO-42, also known as "facility-02" (1947), CHZ-293 (1951), CHZ-572 (1953), and GO-42 (from 1980), and now Exhibition Complex Bunker-42, is a once-secret military complex, bunker, communication center in Moscow, Russia, near the underground Moscow Metro station Taganskaya. It has an area of 7,000 square metres (75,000 sq ft) and is situated at a depth of 65 metres (213 ft) below ground.

== History ==
Construction of the facility began in 1951, in connection with the early threat of nuclear war with the United States. The underground complex was built using the same technique that was used in the construction of the Moscow Metro subway, which is connected by two tunnels. The first tunnel was used to supply the facility and connects to the subway at Taganskaya (circle line) station. The second tunnel connects to the technical areas of Taganskaya.

In 1956, the facility operated as an emergency command post headquarters of the Moscow Air Defence District (PVO) communication center. Personnel at the facility, including technical staff, were changed over every 24 hours. The staff worked in short shifts in order to stay alert and prevent combat anxiety. According to recollections of veterans, many of the staff members worked for various other institutions, including the central telegraph, radio studio, and geodetic laboratory. In the 1960s, the bunker was equipped with everything needed to continue operating in the event of a nuclear attack, including food, fuel, and two artesian wells to provide clean drinking water for an extended period of time.

=== Transfer to private ownership ===
In 2006, the bunker was put up for public auction by the Russian Federal Agency for State Property Management. It was purchased by a private company, Novik-Servis (Новик-Сервис) for 65 million rubles and turned into a museum called "экспозицио́нный ко́мплекс Бу́нкер-42" (jekspoziciónnyj kómpleks Búnker-42), opened in 2006.

== Capacity ==
Approximately 600 people could live and work in the complex for 30 days without assistance from the outside world, thanks to stores of food and medicine, an air recycling system, and diesel generators.

== See also ==
- Stalin's bunker, Samara
- Metro-2
- Mount Yamantau
- Kosvinsky Kamen
- Detachment Hotel
- Cheyenne Mountain Complex
- Raven Rock Mountain Complex
- Mount Weather Emergency Operations Center
- Underground Project 131
- Heng Shan Military Command Center
- Emergency Government Headquarters – in Canada
- The Cold War Museum – a Cold War museum in Warrenton, Virginia
- Plokštinė missile base – a Cold War museum in Lithuania
- Jerusalem–Yitzhak Navon railway station
