= Stalin's bunker, Samara =

Air raid shelter and museum

Coordinates: 53°11′48.3″N 50°5′53″E

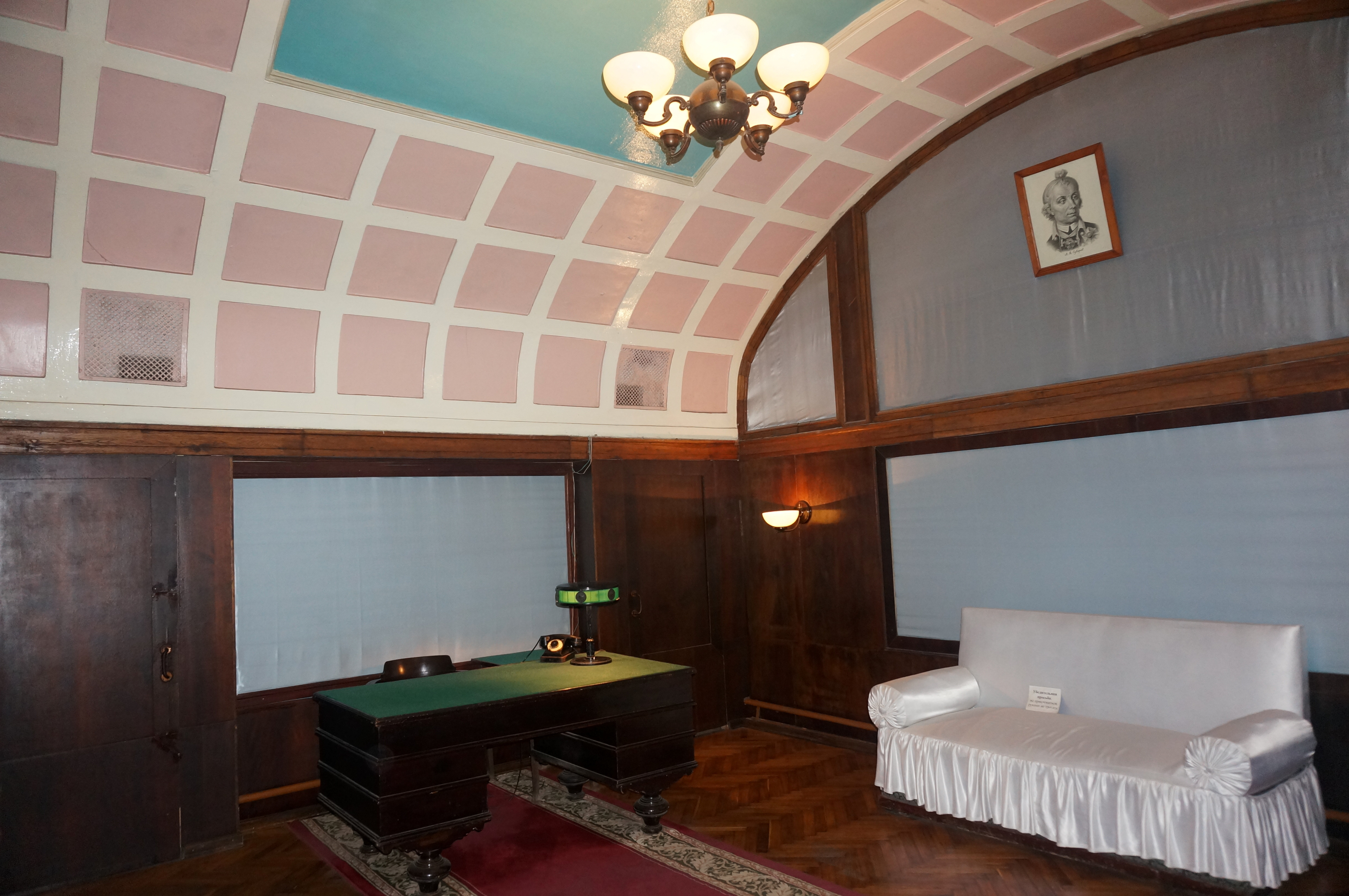
The official office of Stalin in the Bunker. The portrait on the wall depicts Alexander Suvorov.

Stalin's bunker (Russian: Бункер Сталина) is an air raid shelter located near Samara State University of Culture in Samara (former Kuybyshev), Russia. It is a subterranean bunker complex constructed between February and October 1942. It was the alternative Supreme High Command General Headquarters of the Soviet Armed Forces intended for Joseph Stalin during World War II. Stalin's Bunker is located 37 metres (121 ft) beneath the Kuybyshev CPSU oblast Committee building (now Samara State University of Culture occupies it), 100 metres (110 yd) south-east of the Samara Academy Theater. Stalin's Bunker was declassified in 1990. Now the civil defence museum occupies the former air raid shelter. Air-raid shelters for the Soviet High Command were built also in Yaroslavl, Gorky (now Nizhny Novgorod), Kazan, Ulyanovsk, Saratov and Stalingrad (now Volgograd).

== History ==
During World War II, Kuybyshev was chosen to be the alternative capital of the Soviet Union should Moscow fall to the invading Germans. In October 1941, the Communist Party and governmental organizations, diplomatic missions of foreign countries, leading cultural establishments and their staff were evacuated to the city.

On 15 October 1941 the State Defense Committee produced a secret decision No 801 "On evacuation of the Soviet capital Moscow to Kuybyshev". Evacuation of Stalin was envisaged in case of emergency. 21 October 1941 the State Defense Committee produced a secret decision No 826 "On construction of the air raid shelter in Kuybyshev". The Stalin's Bunker was designed by Chief Technology Officer Yulian Ostrovsky and main architect M. Zelenin. They copied construction of Aeroport Moscow Metro station. Subway tunnelers from Moscow and Donbas miners were deployed for the construction of the bunker works. 2900 workers and 800 engineers took part in the construction. Mine-surveying work was steered by I. Drobinin. Soil withdrawal was carried out at night and all builders were under a lifelong gag order. 25,000 cubic meters (880,000 cu. ft.) of soil were excavated in 8 months. 5,000 cubic meters (180,000 cu. ft.) of concrete were used in construction. Stalin's Bunker was put into operation by the government commission on 6 January 1943.

Ironically, Joseph Stalin insisted on staying in Moscow throughout the Battle of Moscow. His daughter Svetlana did shelter in the bunker during the air strikes, but Stalin himself never had any documented visits to the bunker.

== Description ==
Stalin's bunker was designed to survive an explosion equivalent to 2,000 kilograms (2 tons) of TNT. Defensive measures include 23 meters (75') of earthen cover, 4 meters (13') of concrete, and a layer of sand for protection against enemy air raids. The bunker has a power station and a stand-alone system of air regeneration. There are workrooms on the 4th, 5th, 6th and 7th floors. After descending the stairs into the lower section and passing through the steel door, there is a long corridor. On the right side is Stalin's accommodation. On the left side is a convention hall. Several floors up, there is a series of rooms which include a generator, ventilation equipment, accumulators, an elevator motor, pump rooms and the telephone switchboard.

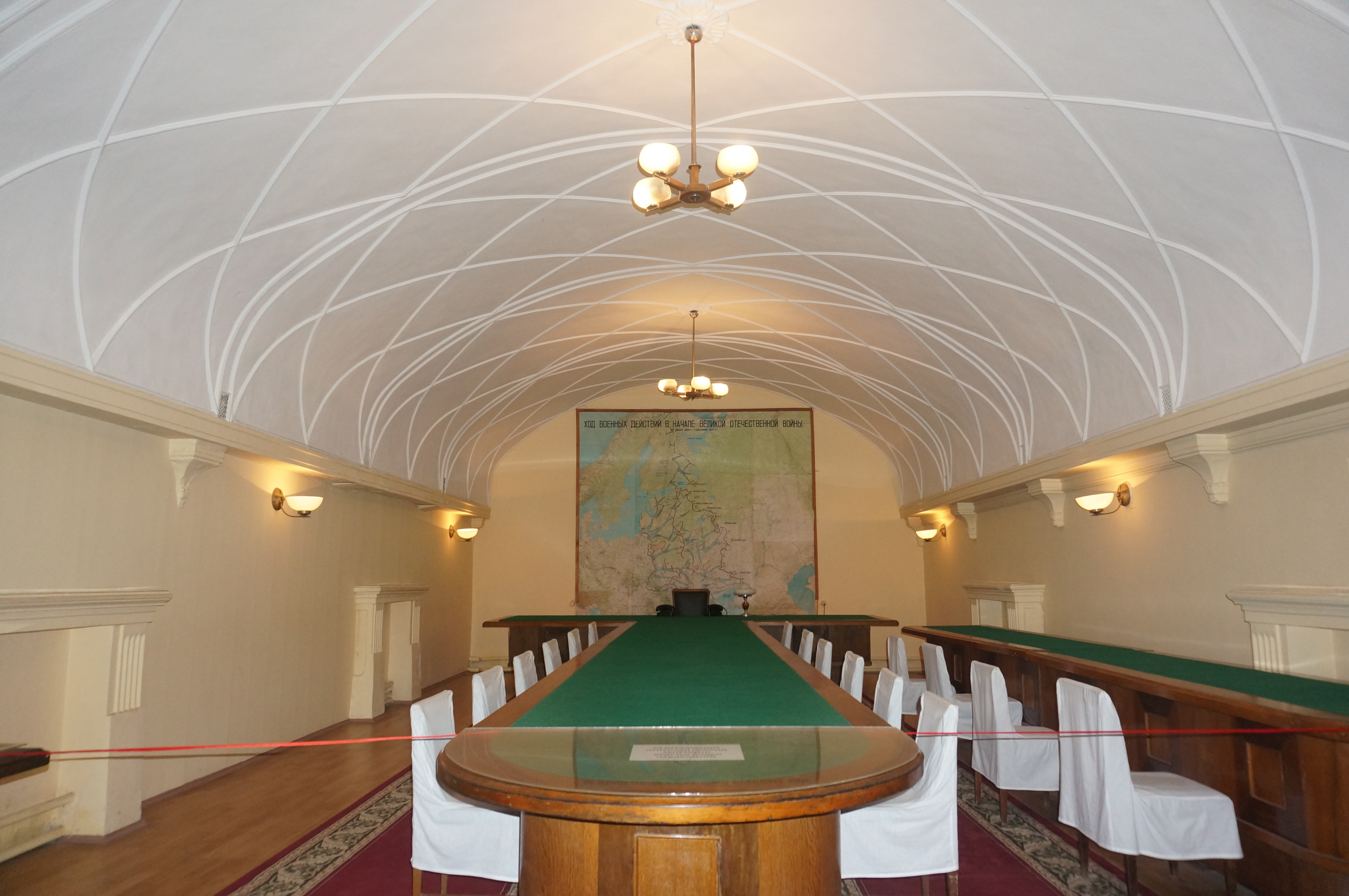
The convention hall

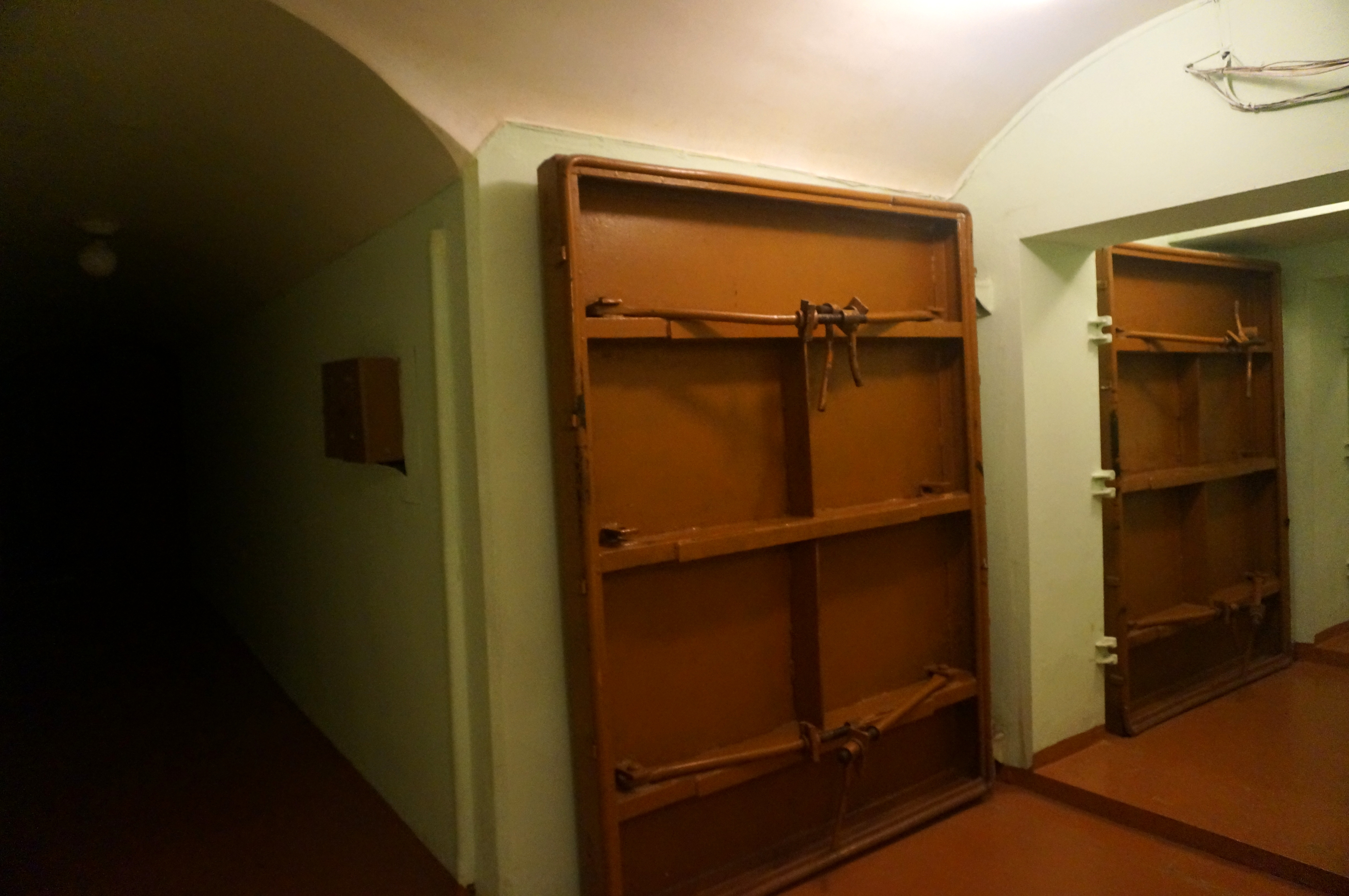
Sealed doors

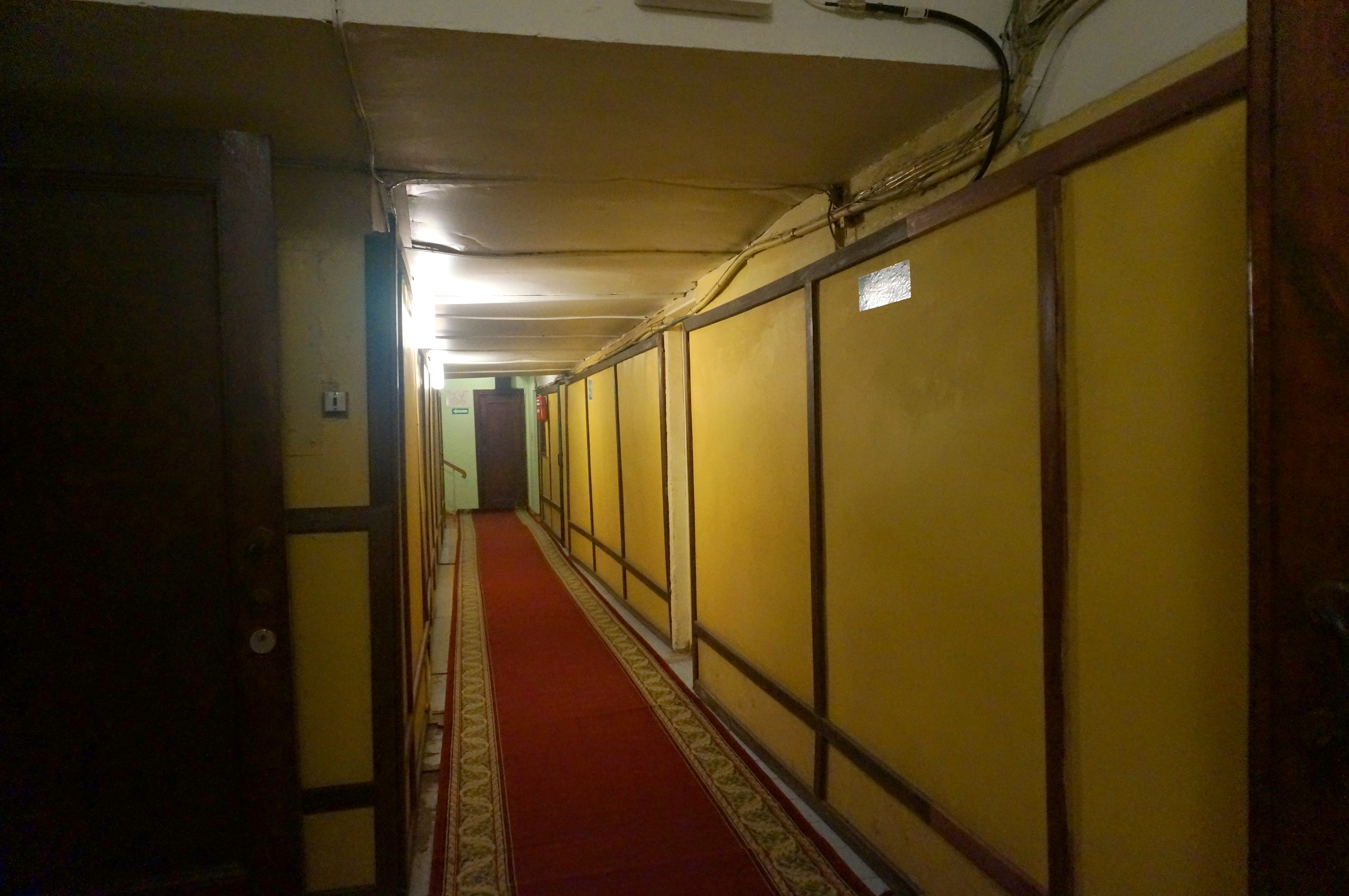
Corridor at the lower section

== See also ==
- Führerbunker
- Matsushiro Underground Imperial Headquarters
- Presidential Emergency Operations Center
