= List of Adolf Hitler's personal staff =

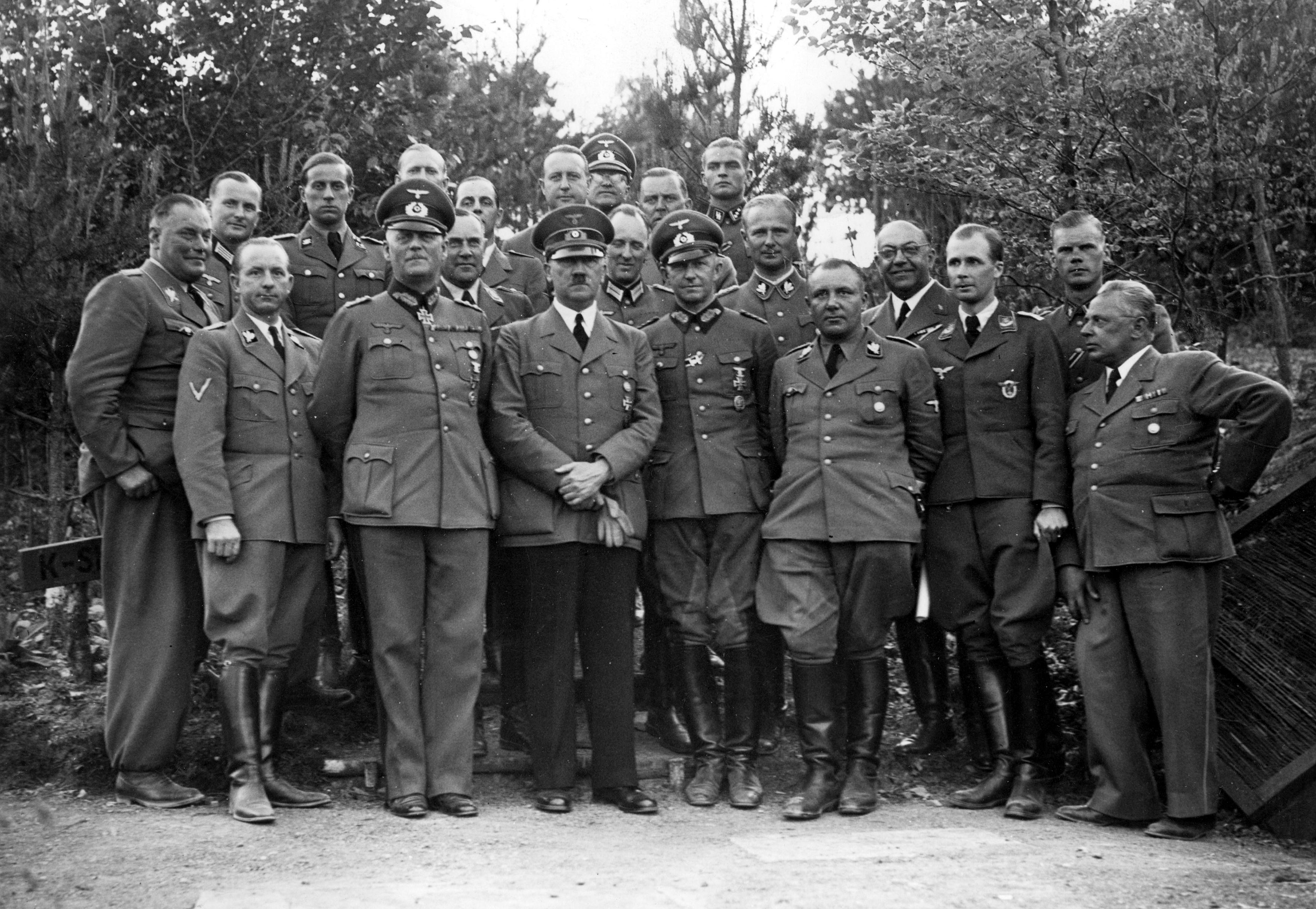
Hitler posing for pictures with his staff, 1940

Adolf Hitler, dictator of Germany from 1933 to 1945, employed a personal staff, which represented different branches and offices throughout his political career. He maintained a group of aides-de-camp and adjutants, including Martin Bormann's younger brother Albert in the National Socialist Motor Corps (NSKK), Friedrich Hoßbach of the Wehrmacht, who was sacked for unfavourable conduct, and Fritz Darges of the Schutzstaffel (SS), who was also dismissed for inappropriate behaviour. Originally an SS adjutant, Otto Günsche was posted on the Eastern Front from August 1943 to February 1944, and in France until March 1944, until he was appointed as one of Hitler's personal adjutants.

Others included valets Hans Hermann Junge, Karl Wilhelm Krause, and his longest serving valet, Heinz Linge. They accompanied him on his travels and were in charge of Hitler's daily routine; including awaking him, providing newspapers and messages, determining the daily menu/meals, and wardrobe. He employed four chauffeurs over the years, including the part-Jewish Emil Maurice, and founding member of the Sturmabteilung (SA), Julius Schreck. Women in his employ included secretaries Christa Schroeder, his chief and longest serving one Johanna Wolf, and his youngest, Traudl Junge. Hitler disliked change in personnel and liked to have people around him that he was used to and who knew his habits. Hitler's personal staff members were in daily contact with him and many were present during his final days in the Führerbunker at the end of World War II in Europe.

== Staff ==
Alphabetically listed per their Christian name
Name	Position (Branch)	Years of service	Notes	Image	Ref.
Albert Bormann	Adjutant (National Socialist Motor Corps)	1931–45	Brother of Hitler's private secretary Martin Bormann. Hitler was fond of Bormann and found him to be trustworthy.		
Alwin-Broder Albrecht	Adjutant (National Socialist Motor Corps)	1938–45	Originally a naval adjutant. Became the subject of controversy for marrying a woman with a bad reputation. On 1 July 1939, he was appointed an NSKK adjutant.		
Anna Döhring	Cook (Berghof)	1938–45	Personal cook to Hitler and married to Herbert Doehring, chief of all civilian personnel at Hitler's house		
Christa Schroeder	Secretary	1933–45	Began working for Hitler in 1933. Later wrote her memoirs about her time as one of his secretaries		
Constanze Manziarly	Cook/dietitian (Berghof)	1943–45	Began working for Hitler from 1943 and was present in Führerbunker during the dictator's final days		
Emil Maurice	Chauffeur (Schutzstaffel)	1925 (Note: It is unknown when Maurice was fired as Hitler's chauffeur; neither historians Ian Kershaw or Heike Görtemaker mention this in their work.)	Early member of the Nazi Party and co-founder of the SS, despite having Jewish ancestry		
Erich Kempka	Chauffeur (Schutzstaffel)	1934–45	Primary chauffeur to Hitler from 1934 to April, 1945		
Friedrich Hoßbach	Adjutant (Wehrmacht)	1934–38	Dismissed as adjutant in 1938 for unfavorable conduct. His most important contribution to history is his creation of the Hossbach Memorandum.		
Fritz Darges	Adjutant (Schutzstaffel)	1943–44	Originally an adjutant for Martin Bormann. Although dismissed in 1944 for inappropriate behavior, Darges went on to command the 5th SS Panzer Regiment of SS Division Wiking. Recipient of the Knight's Cross of the Iron Cross		
Gerda Christian	Secretary	1937–43; 1943–45	Engaged to Erich Kempka and later married to Eckhard Christian		
Gerhard Engel	Adjutant (Army)	1941–43	Appointed an army adjutant in 1941. By his own request in 1943, he transferred to the Western Front. Recipient of the Knight's Cross of the Iron Cross with Oak Leaves		
Georg Betz	Co-pilot (Schutzstaffel)	1932–45	Former captain for Lufthansa prior to joining the Schutzstaffel (SS). He was later killed during the Battle in Berlin.		
Hans Baur	Pilot (Nazi Party)	1932–45	Personal pilot and close ally of Hitler since the political campaigns of the early 1930s		
Hans Hermann Junge	Aide-de-camp and valet (Schutzstaffel)	1940–43	Married to Traudl Humps. Transferred to active service in July 1943 and was killed a year later in an aircraft attack in France		
Heinz Linge	Valet (Schutzstaffel)	1935–45	Hitler's longest serving valet. Would wake up Hitler and keep him stocked with writing materials and spectacles		
Heinrich Borgmann	Adjutant (Army)	1943–45	Recipient of the Knight's Cross of the Iron Cross with Oak Leaves for actions on both fronts. In October 1943 he was appointed army adjutant. He was seriously wounded during the 20 July plot.		
Herbert Döhring	Administrator (Berghof)	1936–43	Administrator of all civilian personnel at Hitler's mountain retreat		
Hugo Blaschke	Dentist (Schutzstaffel)	1933–45	Served as Heinrich Himmler's personal dentist before becoming Hitler's		
Johanna Wolf	Secretary	1929–45	Hitler's chief and longest serving secretary		
Josef "Sepp" Dietrich	Chauffeur (Schutzstaffel)	1928–29	Early member of the Nazi Party and SS. One of Hitler's most trusted bodyguards and Schutzstaffel (SS) commanders		
Julius Schaub	Adjutant (Nazi Party)	1925–45	Hitler's longest serving adjutant. Carried money for Hitler's private use, took care of his travel arrangements, and provided both secretary and security duties		
Julius Schreck	Chauffeur (Sturmabteilung)	1926–36	Early Nazi Party member and co-founder of the Sturmabteilung (SA)		
Karl-Jesko von Puttkamer	Adjutant (Navy)	1939–45	Transferred to active service in 1938. Then returned to the role as naval adjutant and in September 1943 he was promoted to Konteradmiral (rear admiral)		
Karl Wilhelm Krause	Valet (Schutzstaffel)	1934–39	Assisted Hitler with his daily routines and also served as a bodyguard. Dismissed in mid-September 1939 for disobeying an order		
Wilhelm Arndt	Valet (Schutzstaffel)	?-45	Killed on 21 April 1945		
Ludwig Stumpfegger	Surgeon (Schutzstaffel)	1944–45	Became Hitler's personal surgeon after a recommendation from Schutzstaffel (SS) chief Heinrich Himmler		
Martin Bormann	Private Secretary (Nazi Party)	1943–45	Prominent official in Nazi Germany. He gained immense power by using his position as Hitler's private secretary to control the flow of information and access to the Führer.		
Max Wünsche	Adjutant (Schutzstaffel)	1938–41	Recipient of the Knight's Cross of the Iron Cross with Oak Leaves. Originally appointed adjutant to Sepp Dietrich in 1941		
Nicolaus von Below	Adjutant (Luftwaffe)	1937–45	One of only a few people with aristocratic backgrounds to serve in Hitler's inner circle. Became closely associated with the Führer over the years		
Otto Günsche	Adjutant (Schutzstaffel)	1940–41; 1943; 1944–45	Originally a Schutzstaffel (SS) adjutant. From August 1943 to 5 February 1944, he fought on the Eastern Front and in France until March 1944 when he again was appointed a personal adjutant.		
Richard Schulze-Kossens	Aide-de-camp/adjutant (Schutzstaffel)	1941-44	Served as an ordnance officer and SS adjutant at different intervals. Also a member of the Leibstandarte SS Adolf Hitler and the Führerbegleitkommando (FBK), both protection units for Hitler's security		
Rudolf Schmundt	Adjutant (Wehrmacht)	1938–44	Became the Chief of the Personnel Department of the German Army. Died from his injuries following the 20 July plot		
Theodor Morell	Physician (Nazi Party)	1936–45	Personal physician to Hitler and became a controversial figure for his unorthodox treatment methods		
Traudl Junge	Secretary	1942–45	Hitler's youngest secretary. Later wrote her memoirs about her time with Hitler		
Werner Haase	Physician (Schutzstaffel)	1935–45	Personal physician and surgeon for Hitler		
Wilhelm Brückner	Adjutant (Nazi Party)	1930–40	Prior to his dismissal, he supervised all of the Führer's personal servants, valets, bodyguards, and adjutants.		
Wilhelm Burgdorf	Adjutant (Army)	1944–45	Promoted chief of the Heerespersonalamt (Army Personnel Office) and chief adjutant in October 1944		
Willy Johannmeyer	Adjutant (Army)	1945	Heinrich Borgmann's replacement. Recipient of the Knight's Cross of the Iron Cross with Oak Leaves		

== See also ==
- Bibliography of Adolf Hitler
- Bibliography of Nazi Germany
