= Last will and testament of Adolf Hitler =

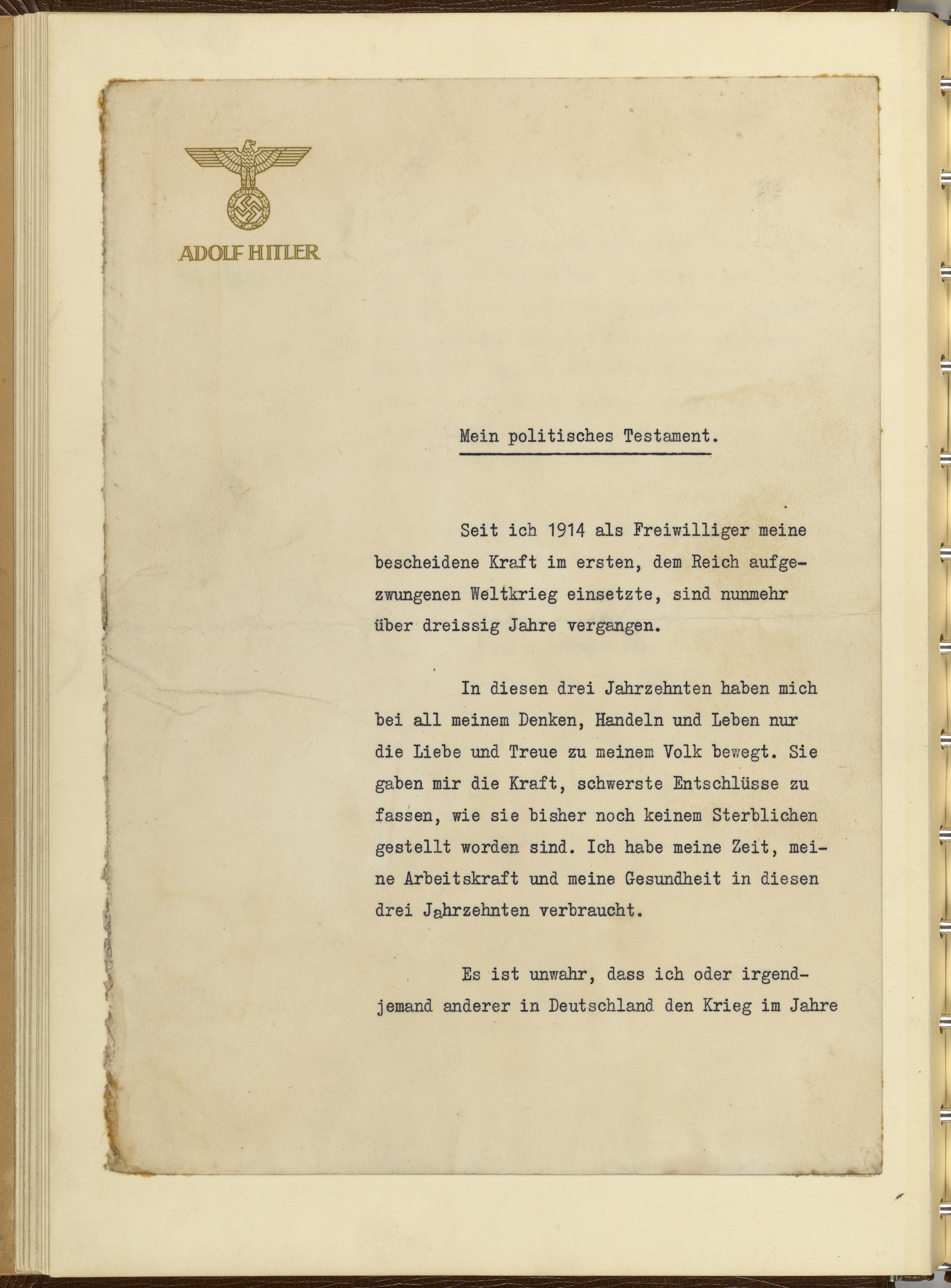
First page of the political testament

Adolf Hitler, chancellor and dictator of Germany from 1933 to 1945, signed his political testament and his private will in the Führerbunker on 29 April 1945, the day before he committed suicide with his wife, Eva Braun. The political testament consisted of two parts in total. In the first, Mein politisches Testament, Hitler denied charges of warmongering, expressed his thanks to Germany's loyal citizens, and encouraged them to continue the struggle. In the second, he declared Heinrich Himmler and Hermann Göring to be traitors, and set out his plan for a new government under Karl Dönitz. Hitler's secretary Traudl Junge recalled that he was reading from notes as he dictated the testament, and it is believed that Joseph Goebbels helped him write it.

Both the Political Testament and the Private Will and Personal Testament of Adolf Hitler were dictated to Junge during the last days of Hitler's life and signed on 29 April 1945. These artifacts are not to be confused with an entirely different—and controversial—document known as The Testament of Adolf Hitler. (Note: The Testament of Adolf Hitler consists of alleged recordings made by Martin Bormann from Hitler's bunker in Berlin; it purports to be a continuation of the widely published table talks Hitler conducted during the course of the war. While previous biographers Joachim Fest and Alan Bullock—as well as other historians—have taken them as legitimate, their authenticity is questioned by a considerable number of scholars, not the least of which includes Ian Kershaw, who refused to reference them in his authoritative work on Hitler. Historian Michael Nilsson has given several forms of evidence to prove it was a forgery. On this, also see Kershaw.)

== Historical context ==
On 16 April 1945, the Battle of Berlin began as the final phase of a war Germany had already lost; yet the Nazi regime, its leadership unwilling to consider capitulation, continued to issue criminal and largely unexecutable orders, relieving subordinates who refused to comply. Hitler's last appeal to Wehrmacht soldiers on that date deployed propaganda to mobilize resistance, asserting that the "Jewish-Bolshevik mortal enemy" would exterminate the Germans, murder their elderly and children, degrade their women, and march their men to Siberia—demanding, in consequence, that soldiers drown the Bolshevik assault "in a bloodbath" through "steadfastness" and "fanaticism." The deaths of as many as 200,000 soldiers and thousands of civilians would follow before the battle ended on 2 May 1945.

On 22 April, at a situation conference in the Führerbunker, Hitler declared that he would remain in Berlin and shoot himself if the city could not be relieved. The night of 24 April saw the Reich Chancellery above the bunker struck by bombs, and on the following day Goebbels recorded in his diary that a heroic death in Berlin would, within five years at most, transform Hitler into a legendary figure and National Socialism into a myth, "consecrated by the ultimate sacrifice." On 25 April, Soviet forces completed the encirclement of Berlin and American and Soviet troops met at Torgau on the Elbe; until that moment, those present in the bunker had still hoped for the collapse of the anti-Hitler coalition.

Hitler learned on 28 April—through Stockholm Radio—of Heinrich Himmler's secret negotiations with the Western Allies and of Himmler's offer to cease the murder of Hungarian Jews in exchange for a partial capitulation. The same day brought news of the unauthorized armistice concluded by Waffen-SS General Karl Wolff with American forces in Italy and of the disobedience of Waffen-SS General Felix Steiner. Hitler responded by ordering the arrest of Hermann Fegelein—the SS liaison to Himmler and Eva Braun's brother-in-law—at his Berlin apartment; an SS summary court condemned Fegelein to death for desertion and complicity in Himmler's unauthorized contacts, and Hitler signed the execution order, which was carried out in the garden of the Reich Chancellery. This final murder order is interpreted as personal revenge against the unreachable Himmler and as an expression of Hitler's fear of deposition or assassination by SS personnel in his immediate circle. Hitler was informed during the day that the relief armies on which the bunker's occupants had pinned their last hopes were encircled and cut off from one another. Shortly before midnight on 28 April, Hitler married Eva Braun, who had chosen to die with him. Around 2:00 a.m. on 29 April, he dictated both his private will and his political testament.

== Will ==
The last will was a short document signed on 29 April at 04:00. It acknowledged his marriage—but does not name Eva Braun—and that they choose death over disgrace of deposition or capitulation; and that their bodies were to be cremated. The will divided up Hitler's belongings as follows:

His art collection is left to "a gallery in my home town of Linz on the Danube". Objects of "sentimental value or necessary for the maintenance of a modest simple life" went to "brothers and sisters," and "above all" Eva Braun's mother and his "faithful co-workers" such as his "old secretaries" and housekeeper Mrs. [Anni] Winter. However, he also required that his chief private secretary Martin Bormann be the one who was "permitted to take out everything that has a sentimental value or is necessary for the maintenance of a modest simple life" for these people.

Whatever else of value was to be given to the Nazi Party, and then, should the party no longer exist, to the State. Should the State also be destroyed, "no further decision of mine is necessary."

Bormann was nominated as the will's executor and was also "given full legal authority to make all decisions." The will was witnessed by Bormann, Goebbels, and Colonel Nicolaus von Below.

== Testament ==
The last political testament was signed at the same time as Hitler's last will, 04:00 on 29 April 1945. It was in two parts. The first part of the testament talked of his motivations in the three decades since volunteering in World War I, repeated his claim that neither he "nor anyone else in Germany wanted the war in 1939," stated his reasons for his intention to commit suicide, and praised and expressed his thanks to the German people for their support and achievements. Also included in the first testament are statements detailing his claim that he tried to avoid war with other states and attributed responsibility for it to "international Jewry and its helpers." He would not "forsake Berlin [...] even though the forces were too small to hold out." Hitler expressed his intent to choose death rather than "fall into the hands of enemies" and "the masses" in need of "a spectacle arranged by Jews." He concluded with a call to continue the "sacrifice" and "struggle." He expressed hope for a renaissance of the National Socialist movement with the realisation of a "true people's community (Volksgemeinschaft)."

The first part's closing passages directed appeals specifically to the supreme commands of the Army, Air Force, and Navy to "strengthen the spirit of resistance of our soldiers in the National Socialist sense," citing as justification Hitler's own choice of death over "cowardly abdication or even capitulation"—a standard of conduct he declared ought henceforth to belong to the "concept of honor of the German officer." The testament's invocation of the six-year war as "the most glorious and valiant manifestation of a people's will to live" also referred back explicitly to Hitler's Reichstag speech of 30 January 1939, in which he had first threatened the "annihilation of the Jewish race in Europe" should international finance Jewry succeed in plunging nations into another world war—a speech disseminated through all NS media, published as a book, and incorporated into the propaganda film Der ewige Jude in November 1940.

The second part of his testament lays out Hitler's intentions for the German government and the Nazi Party after his death and details who was to succeed him. He expelled Reichsmarschall Hermann Göring from the party and dismissed him from all of his state offices. He also cancelled the 1941 decree naming Göring as his successor in the event of his death. To replace him, Hitler named Großadmiral Karl Dönitz as President of the Reich and Supreme Commander of the Armed Forces. Reichsführer-SS and Interior Minister Heinrich Himmler was also expelled from the party and dismissed from all of his state offices for attempting to negotiate peace with the western Allies without Hitler's permission or knowledge. Hitler declared both Himmler and Göring to be traitors.

Hitler appointed the following as the new Cabinet and what he saw as the new leaders of the German nation:

- President of the Reich (Reichspräsident), Supreme Commander of the Armed Forces (Oberster Befehlshaber der Wehrmacht), Minister of War (Kriegsminister), and Commander-in-Chief of the Navy (Oberbefehlshaber der Kriegsmarine): Grand Admiral Karl Dönitz
- Chancellor of the Reich (Reichskanzler): Joseph Goebbels
- Party Minister (Parteiminister): Martin Bormann
- Foreign Minister (Aussenminister): Arthur Seyss-Inquart
- Interior Minister (Innenminister): Gauleiter Paul Giesler
- Commander-in-Chief of the Army (Oberbefehlshaber des Heeres): Field Marshal Ferdinand Schörner
- Commander-in-Chief of the Air Force (Oberbefehlshaber der Luftwaffe): Field Marshal Robert Ritter von Greim
- Reichsführer-SS and Chief of Police (Reichsführer-SS und Chef der Deutschen Polizei): Gauleiter Karl Hanke
- Minister of Economy (Wirtschaft): Walther Funk
- Minister of Agriculture (Landwirtschaft): Herbert Backe
- Minister of Justice (Justiz): Otto Georg Thierack
- Minister of Culture (Kultur): Dr. Gustav Adolf Scheel
- Minister of Propaganda (Propaganda): Dr. Werner Naumann
- Minister of Finance (Finanzen): Johann Ludwig Graf Schwerin von Krosigk
- Minister of Labour (Arbeit): Dr. Theo Hupfauer
- Minister of Munitions (Rüstung): Karl-Otto Saur
- Director of the German Labour Front and member of the Cabinet (Leiter der Deutschen Arbeitsfront und Mitglied des Reichskabinetts: Reichsminister): Dr. Robert Ley

The closing passages of the second part instructed those still present in the bunker not to die alongside Hitler but to continue fighting elsewhere; demanded that they place the "honor of the nation" above all personal interests; and declared the construction of a National Socialist state "the work of centuries to come." Hitler's final sentence bound all Germans, National Socialists, and Wehrmacht soldiers to obey the successor government "loyally unto death," and concluded with an injunction to the leadership and following of the nation to observe strictly the racial laws and to offer "merciless resistance" to "the world-poisoner of all peoples, international Jewry." Witnessed by Goebbels, Bormann, General Wilhelm Burgdorf, and General Hans Krebs.

=== Goebbels' addendum ===
Goebbels appended a signed statement to the testament, timed at 5:30 a.m. on 29 April, declaring that he was compelled—for the first and only time—to disobey his Führer. Surrounded by "the delirium of treason," he argued that at least a few must hold to Hitler "unconditionally and unto death," and that this "sacrifice" would "inspire" others through a "clear and comprehensible example." He stated his irrevocable decision not to leave the capital, and expressed his intention to end a life that held no further personal value for him if he could not spend it in service to Hitler at his side. Goebbels invoked his wife and children—the latter, he wrote, too young to speak for themselves, but certain to endorse the decision were they old enough to do so.

On the afternoon of 30 April, about a day and a half after he signed his last will and testament, Hitler and Braun committed suicide. Within the next two days, Goebbels, Burgdorf, and Krebs also committed suicide. Bormann's fate was unknown for decades, but the positive identification of his remains in 1998 indicated that he died fleeing on 2 May 1945 to avoid capture by the Soviet Red Army forces encircling Berlin.

== Authorship ==
In his book The Bunker, James O'Donnell, after comparing the wording of Hitler's last testament to the writings and statements of both Hitler and Goebbels, concluded that Goebbels was at least partly responsible for helping Hitler write it. Junge stated that Hitler was reading from notes when he dictated the testament after midnight on 29 April.

=== Rhetorical self-stylization ===
The testament's language drew on expressions and rhetorical devices that recurred throughout Hitler's speeches, constituting a recognizable and deliberate register: the claim of a historically unprecedented, superhuman burden placed upon him; the heroic self-sacrifice in service of the nation; the framing of voluntary death as participation in the fate of soldiers killed in battle; and the death of the Führer as both a spur to final resistance and a seed of the future rebirth and ultimate realization of the National Socialist vision—above all, the perpetual obligation to destroy the eternal enemy. This rhetoric, alongside Hitler's final order of the day to Wehrmacht soldiers on 16 April 1945, has been characterized as deliberate "heroic staging" and "legend-building." Marcel Atze argued that the survival of the heroic persona depended crucially on a death well staged and projected outward; for Hitler, "immortality at any price" was the animating goal, and the death concealed from all eyes in a bunker constituted "the last conscious act of the NS myth-makers," designed to be received and transmitted as a self-sacrifice—the crowning act of a redemptive mission.

Hitler biographer Alan Bullock emphasized that Hitler chose his words with care to present his suicide as a union with the soldiers dying for him and as the fulfillment of duty unto death. The Austrian historian Werner Telesko interpreted this rhetorical project as the expression of an apocalyptic historical vision whose core was the demand to anchor one's own history in the memory of posterity—to present oneself perpetually as the necessary "end" of history, admitting no further development or expansion; the testaments were, in his view, embodiments of "a boundless delusion of being compelled somehow to endure in the consciousness of posterity." Secretary Junge herself observed, in her memoir, that Hitler had disappointed those present who expected a confession of guilt or at least a truthful accounting—delivering instead "explanations, accusations, and demands" that she and the German people and the whole world already knew.

The contradiction between this rhetoric and Hitler's own previous condemnations of suicide—as recently as 21 April 1945, following news of the Leipzig mayor's self-inflicted death, denouncing it as cowardice and "flight from responsibility"—was not lost on those in a position to evaluate it directly. Helmuth Weidling, the combat commandant responsible for the defense of Berlin, released his soldiers from their oath immediately upon receiving news of Hitler's death, stating: "On 30 April 1945 the Führer took his own life and thereby abandoned those of us who had sworn loyalty to him."

== History of the documents ==
Three messengers were assigned to take the will and political testament out of the besieged Führerbunker to ensure their presence for posterity. The first messenger was deputy press attaché Heinz Lorenz. He was arrested by the British while travelling under an alias as a journalist from Luxembourg. He revealed the existence of two more copies and messengers: Willy Johannmeyer, Hitler's army adjutant, and Bormann's adjutant SS-Standartenführer Wilhelm Zander. Zander was using the pseudonym "Friedrich Wilhelm Paustin" to travel, and was shortly apprehended along with Johannmeyer in the American zone of occupation. Thus, two copies of the papers ended up in American hands, and one set in British hands. The texts of the documents were published widely in the American and British press by January 1946 but British Foreign Secretary, Ernest Bevin, considered restricting access to these documents. He feared they might become cult objects among the Germans. Since they were public knowledge already, the Americans did not share these concerns but nonetheless agreed to refrain from further publication of them. Hitler's testament and his marriage certificate were presented to US President Harry S. Truman. One set was placed on public display at the National Archives in Washington for several years.

Herman Rothman, who had fled Germany as a persecuted Jew in 1939 and fought against the Nazi regime as a British soldier, discovered the originals of both Hitler testaments sewn into the jacket of Lorenz during interrogations of German prisoners of war. He was assigned to translate them into English under the strictest secrecy. His account of the discovery, along with the testimony of police guard Hermann Karnau as an eyewitness to events in the Führerbunker, was published in 2009. Three pages of one original are displayed at the Imperial War Museum in London, including the first page containing the dismissals and the final page bearing the witnesses' signatures. The copy transported by Zander is held at the National Archives in Washington, D.C.

Hitler's original last will and testament is currently housed in the security vault of the National Archives at College Park in Maryland. (Note: A three-part article chronicling how the documents came into the possession of the Allies can be found at the National Archives' webpage.)

== Aftermath ==
All four witnesses to the political testament died shortly afterwards. Goebbels and his wife committed suicide. Burgdorf and Krebs committed suicide together on the night of 1/2 May in the bunker. Bormann's exact time and place of death remain uncertain; his remains were discovered near the site of the bunker in 1972 and identified by DNA analysis in 1998. He probably died the same night trying to escape from the Führerbunker. (Note: Martin Bormann—in one of the 10 groups attempting to escape from the bunker complex—managed to cross the Spree. He was reported to have died a short distance from the Weidendammer bridge, his body was seen and identified by Artur Axmann who followed the same route.)

Bormann broadcast news of Hitler's death to Dönitz on the evening of 30 April, suppressing the testament's demands for continued fighting and concealing the names of the other designated successors; a second signal the following morning informed Dönitz only that the testament was in force and that Bormann intended to reach him as soon as possible. Goebbels dispatched a final signal from the bunker notifying Dönitz of the time of Hitler's death—without disclosing the suicide—naming the cabinet positions assigned by the testament, and indicating to whom copies had been sent. Bormann left the Führerbunker on 1 May as ordered; he was stopped by Soviet soldiers near the Lehrter Bahnhof and killed himself with a poison capsule. Goebbels attempted on 1 May to negotiate a partial capitulation with the Soviets against Hitler's testamentary instructions, failed, and that evening poisoned his six children before he and his wife took their own lives around 8:30 p.m. The testament's witnesses Burgdorf and Krebs took their own lives on the afternoon of 1 May 1945.

In the Flensburg Government of Hitler's appointed successor as Reichspräsident Dönitz, the depositions of Albert Speer and Franz Seldte were ignored (or the two ministers quickly reinstated). Neither former incumbent Joachim von Ribbentrop nor Hitler's appointee, Seyß-Inquart, held the post of Foreign Minister. The post was given to Lutz Graf Schwerin von Krosigk, who after Goebbels' suicide temporarily became the Leading Minister of the German Reich (Head of Cabinet, post equivalent to Chancellor). He declined the position a day later.

Dönitz treated the political testament as a formally valid, unquestionable Führer decree under National Socialist legal theory, yet departed from Hitler's last will in practice: he filled his cabinet according to his own judgment, pursued a partial capitulation, and limited his own tenure to the point at which the German people could express their will regarding a head of state—implicitly invoking Article 41 of the Weimar Constitution. Since 1946, Dönitz had maintained that he assumed Hitler also intended to capitulate, learning the contrary only from the testament itself—a claim historians have characterized as self-serving legend-building, given that Dönitz had obeyed Hitler's known will to fight on for as long as he remained uncertain of Hitler's death. The Allied powers recognized Dönitz pragmatically as Wehrmacht Supreme Commander and thus as a negotiating partner for the unconditional surrender until 8 May 1945, but thereafter contested his authority as Reichspräsident on the grounds that he could produce only copies of radio signals rather than original documentation. A legal opinion produced by National Socialist jurists on 16 May 1945 certified the "unimpeachable legitimacy" of Dönitz's position with reference to Hitler's last will; Dönitz, arrested on 23 May, protested against his removal in writing on 7 July 1945 and insisted that his government remained valid under international law. The International Military Tribunal at Nuremberg treated Dönitz, in accordance with his actual exercise of power until 8 May, as Hitler's legal successor and thus held him responsible for the crime of aggressive war.

In the German far right, the testamentary succession has been invoked—drawing on Dönitz's own self-presentation, which he reinforced through correspondence with the extremist Manfred Roeder in 1972—to characterize Dönitz as "the only lawful successor of Hitler" whose government never surrendered, thereby framing the Federal Republic of Germany as an illegal state imposed from without and legitimating claims of a right of resistance against its institutions. Only three of Hitler's known "brothers and sisters" survived infancy and were still living at the time of death, full-blooded sister Paula Hitler and half-siblings Alois Hitler Jr. and Angela Hitler. Alois Hitler Jr.'s only surviving son William, who was raised and supported by only his mother and her family after Alois Jr. deserted them while fighting for Germany during World War I, was also estranged from his uncle Adolf Hitler, who he publicly stated he "hated" by 1939. William defected to Britain where he had previously lived before taking up residency in Germany in 1933 and to the United States, where he served as a U.S. soldier during World War II. Despite being mentioned in the will, Alois Jr. had in fact only been a Nazi Party member prior to Hitler's rule from 1926 to 1927. Though they were also named in the will, Hitler was acknowledged to have had a low opinion of his sister Paula and his half-sister Angela, referring to them both as "stupid geese." In 1952, Paula tried to claim her inheritance under the will, but was unsuccessful because Hitler had yet to be legally declared dead.

All three of Hitler's "old secretaries", who were named in the will as being among the co-workers who could inherit some of his belongings, were caught and arrested. Johanna Wolf and Christa Schroeder would be arrested in May 1945 and Gerda Christian in March 1946. Hitler's youngest secretary Traudl Junge, who typed Hitler's testaments, was arrested in June 1945.

Numerous items which were in Hitler's possession at the time of his death were auctioned off in April 1971 by the estate of his housekeeper Anni Winter. In 1954, a court ruling resulted in Winter losing possession of numerous items to the state of Bavaria. However, Winter was allowed to keep some of items, which she pledged to sell in order to acquire a cafe. By 1971, Winter was acknowledged to have had possession of at least five dozen items of Hitler's, including numerous personal photographs. According to Time, Winter had an "ardor for collecting just about anything Hitler touched."

== Historiographical reception ==
=== The testament as a Holocaust document ===
The testament occupies a significant place in Holocaust scholarship by virtue of its statements concerning Jews—statements whose consistency with Hitler's documented antisemitism from 1919 to his death has been emphasized repeatedly. Ernst Nolte observed that Hitler's closing sentence "could appear word for word in that first document of his political activity, the letter to Gemlich": a quarter-century had passed, filled with the most monstrous events—among the most recent of which bore the name Auschwitz—yet "Adolf Hitler had remained unchanged." Gerald Fleming read the testament as Hitler's last attempt to bind the Germans to an eternal hatred of Jews. Klaus Hildebrand argued that the destruction of the Jews was the central goal of Hitler's policy from the outset—demanded as early as 16 September 1919 and present in the final sentence of the testament, which called for "merciless resistance against the world-poisoner of all peoples, international Jewry."

Historian David Bankier interpreted Hitler's return to the 1939 Reichstag speech as part of a deliberate rhetorical strategy shared by Hitler and Goebbels: announcing the destruction of the Jews openly while simultaneously suppressing all specific detail, thereby testing public complicity, sustaining speculation about what was actually happening, and implicating the population as knowing participants. By framing the Holocaust as the fulfillment of a prophecy tied to the outcome of the war rather than as a criminal act, Hitler presented it as objective, quasi-determined occurrence—and the rhetoric served, retrospectively, as a kind of alibi. The reference to "more humane means" of destroying the enemy has been widely understood as a cynical circumlocution for the gassing of Jews in the extermination camps.

The document has figured prominently in the historiographical debate between intentionalists and functionalists. Hans Mommsen and Martin Broszat argued that Hitler issued no explicit order for the Holocaust; Mommsen characterized Hitler's role as that of an instigator and sharp agitator who avoided binding himself to posterity through unambiguous commands, raising doubt as to whether Hitler fully reckoned with the real consequences of his annihilation discourse. Historians who weight Hitler's antisemitism as the decisive cause of his actions, and who emphasize his central role in the decision for, planning of, and execution of the Holocaust, draw on the testament in support of that case. For Shlomo Aronson, Hitler's final statements on Jews refuted explanatory models that reduced the Holocaust to an instrument of broader imperial-racial goals. Ian Kershaw identified Hitler's claim to have carried out the annihilation of the Jews as announced in 1939 as "a key passage, an indirect reference to the Final Solution." Saul Friedländer, noting that Hitler had received detailed reports of SS mass murders of Soviet Jews and had issued execution orders, asked why—if Hitler suppressed or psychologically evaded knowledge of the annihilation—he should have "boasted of precisely this annihilation of the Jews" in his last political statement, presenting it as the greatest service National Socialism had rendered to humanity.

Robert Wistrich identified in Hitler's justification of the destruction of the Jews—framed as a response to the war and as a "more humane" combating of enemies—the beginning of Holocaust denial; the argument presupposed Hitler's knowledge of the Holocaust while simultaneously displacing moral responsibility onto the supposed aggressor. Christian Goeschel situated the testament within the unprecedented wave of suicides among senior and mid-level NS functionaries at the war's end and identified it as the exemplary instance of four interlocking suicide motives: the destructive violent core of NS ideology, rejection of Allied jurisdiction, the desire to control the terms of one's own death, and the attempt to determine the historical image of posterity through a dramatic exit. The document encapsulated, in highly stylized form, Hitler's fanatical antisemitism and his displacement of guilt—making "Jewry" responsible for war and suffering while simultaneously expressing satisfaction at a self-caused destruction. Hermann Lübbe read the testament as an unsurpassable exemplar of NS ideology's derivation of an absolute duty to commit genocide from the dogma of racial struggle as a law of world history—a self-reinforcing moral framework in which ideologically sanctioned higher ends supplied "the self-provision of a good conscience," constituting a necessary condition for the genocidal policy. Mark Weitzman, of the Simon Wiesenthal Center, read the testament's closing passages as a command-like charge to avenge a historical humiliation framed as a Jewish victory—one that has exercised a historically traceable influence on global right-wing extremism, whose ideological constant of radical antisemitism may be stronger today, in the wake of National Socialism's defeat and the founding of the State of Israel in 1948, than at any previous moment.

=== The testament and the succession ===
Historians have been more skeptical regarding the testament's succession provisions, questioning whether Hitler attached more than declaratory significance to them: Bormann had little prospect of reaching Dönitz in Schleswig-Holstein; Hanke was besieged in Breslau; and Goebbels had made his intention to die in Berlin unmistakably clear. Hitler's instruction to fight unconditionally to the end was, moreover, incompatible both with his knowledge of the Allies' positions and with his own transfer of command authority to Dönitz, rendering it practically unenforceable.

== Bibliography ==
- Arad, Yitzhak; Gutman, Israel; Margaliot, Abraham (1999). Documents on the Holocaust: Selected Sources on the Destruction of the Jews of Germany and Austria, Poland, and the Soviet Union. Lincoln: University of Nebraska Press. ISBN 978-0-8032-5937-9.
- Aronson, Shlomo (2004). Hitler, the Allies, and the Jews. Cambridge: Cambridge University Press. ISBN 978-0-521-83877-1.
- Atze, Marcel (2003). „Unser Hitler": Der Hitler-Mythos im Spiegel der deutschsprachigen Literatur nach 1945 [“Our Hitler”: The Hitler Myth as Reflected in Post-1945 German-Language Literature] (in German). Göttingen: Wallstein. ISBN 978-3-89244-644-6.
- Bankier, David (2002). "The Use of Antisemitism in Nazi Wartime Propaganda". In Berenbaum, Michael; Peck, Abraham J. (eds.). The Holocaust and History: The Known, the Unknown, the Disputed, and the Reexamined. Bloomington: Indiana University Press. ISBN 978-0-253-21529-1.
- Beevor, Antony (2002). Berlin: The Downfall 1945. London: Viking–Penguin Books. ISBN 978-0-670-03041-5.
- Benz, Wolfgang (2010). Vorurteil und Genozid: Ideologische Prämissen des Völkermords [Prejudice and Genocide: The Ideological Premises of Murdering Entire Peoples] (in German). Vienna: Böhlau Verlag. ISBN 978-3-205-78554-5.
- Bradsher, Greg (2016). "The Search for Hitler's Political Testament, Personal Will, and Marriage Certificate". U.S. National Archives.
- Bohn, Robert; Elvert, Jürgen (1995). Kriegsende im Norden. Stuttgart: Franz Steiner. ISBN 978-3-515-06728-7.
- Brown, Jonathan; Duff, Oliver (17 August 2006). "The black sheep of the family? The rise and fall of Hitler's scouse nephew". The Independent. London. ISSN 1741-9743.
- Bullock, Alan (2000). Hitler: Biographie 1889–1945. Augsburg: Bechtermünz. ISBN 978-3-8289-0378-4.
- Eckert, Astrid M. (2012). The Struggle for the Files: The Western Allies and the Return of German Archives after the Second World War. Cambridge University Press. ISBN 978-0-521-88018-3.
- Evans, Richard J. (2008). The Third Reich at War. New York: Penguin Group. ISBN 978-0-14-311671-4.
- Fleming, Gerald (1987). Hitler and the Final Solution. Berkeley: University of California Press. ISBN 978-0-520-06022-7.
- Frank, Mario (2005). Der Tod im Führerbunker: Hitlers letzte Tage. Munich: Siedler. ISBN 978-3-88680-815-1.
- Friedländer, Saul (2007). Nachdenken über den Holocaust. Munich: Beck. ISBN 978-3-406-54824-6.
- Fuhrer, Armin (16 May 2021). "Seine Kneipe war beliebter Nazi-Treffpunkt: Das bewegte Leben von Hitlers Halbbruder Alois". Focus.
- Glanninger, Peter (2009). Rassismus und Rechtsextremismus: Rassistische Argumentationsmuster und ihre historischen Entwicklungslinien. Frankfurt am Main: Peter Lang. ISBN 978-3-631-57501-7.
- Goebbels, Joseph (1977). Tagebücher 1945: Die letzten Aufzeichnungen. Hamburg: Hoffmann und Campe. ISBN 978-3-455-08941-7.
- Goeschel, Christian (2005). "Methodische Überlegungen zur Geschichte der Selbsttötung im Nationalsozialismus". In Bähr, Andreas; Medick, Hans (eds.). Sterben von eigener Hand: Selbsttötung als kulturelle Praxis. Cologne: Böhlau. ISBN 978-3-412-18405-6.
- Groehler, Olaf (1995). 1945, die Neue Reichskanzlei: das Ende. Berlin: Brandenburgisches Verlags-Haus. ISBN 978-3-894-88087-3.
- Harris, Whitney R.; Safferling, Christoph; Seeberger, Ulrike (2008). Tyrannen vor Gericht: Das Verfahren gegen die deutschen Hauptkriegsverbrecher nach dem Zweiten Weltkrieg in Nürnberg 1945–1946. Berlin: Berliner Wissenschafts-Verlag.
- Hildebrand, Klaus (2009). Das Dritte Reich. Munich: Oldenbourg. ISBN 978-3-486-59200-9.
- Hilger, Andreas; Schmeitzner, Mike; Vollnhals, Clemens (2006). Sowjetisierung oder Neutralität?. Göttingen: Vandenhoeck & Ruprecht. ISBN 978-3-525-36906-7.
- Hillmann, Jörg; Zimmermann, John (2014) [2002]. "Die »Reichsregierung« in Flensburg" [The "Government" in Flensburg]. Kriegsende 1945 in Deutschland (in German). Munich: Walter de Gruyter. ISBN 978-3-486-83332-4.
- Hitler, Adolf (1945a). My Private Will and Testament .
- Hitler, Adolf (1945b). My Political Testament .
- International Military Tribunal (2019) [1946]. Nazi Conspiracy and Aggression. Vol. VI. Washington, D.C.: United States Government Printing Office. ISBN 978-1-64594-028-9.
- Jaschke, Hans-Gerd; Rätsch, Birgit; Winterberg, Yury (2001). Nach Hitler: radikale Rechte rüsten auf. Munich: Bertelsmann. ISBN 978-3-570-00566-8.
- Joachimsthaler, Anton (1999) [1995]. The Last Days of Hitler: The Legends, The Evidence, The Truth. Translated by Bölger, Helmut. London: Brockhampton Press. ISBN 978-1-86019-902-8.
- Kershaw, Ian (2001). Hitler, 1936–1945: Nemesis. New York: W. W. Norton & Company. ISBN 978-0-393-04994-7.
- Kershaw, Ian (2008). Hitler: A Biography. New York: W. W. Norton & Company. ISBN 978-0-393-06757-6.
- Kershaw, Ian (2011). Das Ende: Kampf bis in den Untergang. NS-Deutschland 1944/45 (3rd ed.). Munich: Deutsche Verlags-Anstalt. ISBN 978-3-421-04533-1.
- Krautkrämer, Elmar (1962). Deutsche Geschichte nach dem Zweiten Weltkrieg. Hildesheim: Lax.
- Lang, Jochen von (1979). The Secretary: Martin Bormann, the Man Who Manipulated Hitler. New York: Random House. ISBN 978-0-394-50321-9.
- Lübbe, Hermann (1997). Modernisierung und Folgelasten: Trends kultureller und politischer Evolution. Berlin: Springer. ISBN 978-3-540-62154-6.
- Lüdde-Neurath, Walter; Baum, Walter (1964). Regierung Dönitz: die letzten Tage des Dritten Reiches. Göttingen: Musterschmidt.
- Maye, Brian (18 November 2019). "An Irishman's Diary on Bridget Dowling, Hitler's sister-in-law". The Irish Times.
- McDonough, Frank (2021). The Hitler Years: Disaster, 1940–1945. New York: St. Martin's Press. ISBN 978-1-250-27512-7.
- Miller, Michael (2006). Leaders of the SS and German Police. Vol. 1. San Jose, CA: R. James Bender. ISBN 978-0-912138-35-0.
- Mitchell, Otis C. (2013). Hitler's Stormtroopers and the Attack on the German Republic, 1919–1933. Jefferson, NC: McFarland. ISBN 978-0-7864-7729-6.
- Mommsen, Hans (2002). Auschwitz, 17. Juli 1942: Der Weg zur europäischen „Endlösung der Judenfrage". Munich: Deutscher Taschenbuch Verlag. ISBN 978-3-423-30605-8.
- Nilsson, Michael (2018). "Constructing a Pseudo-Hitler? The question of the authenticity of Hitlers politisches Testament". European Review of History. 26 (5): 871–891. doi:10.1080/13507486.2018.1532983. S2CID 149705671.
- Nolte, Ernst (2000) [1963]. Der Faschismus in seiner Epoche: Action française, Italienischer Faschismus, Nationalsozialismus. Munich: Piper. ISBN 978-3-492-20365-4.
- "NS-Archiv: Adolf Hitler, Die Testamente". NS-Archiv (in German).—The German version of the testament includes the fifteen other names only noted as "Here follow fifteen others" in the English translation published by the U.S. Government.
- O'Donnell, James Preston (1978). The Bunker: The History of the Reich Chancellery Group. Boston: Houghton Mifflin. ISBN 978-0-395-25719-7.
- Rahn, Werner (2005). Deutsche Marinen im Wandel: Vom Symbol nationaler Einheit zum Instrument internationaler Sicherheit. Munich: Oldenbourg. ISBN 978-3-486-56731-1.
- Redlich, Fritz (1998). Hitler: Diagnosis of a Destructive Prophet. New York: Oxford University Press. ISBN 978-0-19-505782-9.
- Rothman, Herman (2009). Hitler's Will. Stroud: History Press. ISBN 978-0-7524-4834-3.
- Schreckenberg, Heinz (2005). "Erlösungsantisemitismus? Überlegungen zu Hitlers Genozidbefehl im Dezember 1941". In Barnbrock, Christoph; Klän, Werner (eds.). Gottes Wort in der Zeit: verstehen – verkündigen – verbreiten. Münster: Lit Verlag. ISBN 978-3-82587-132-1.
- Steinert, Marlis G. (1967). Die 23 Tage der Regierung Dönitz. Düsseldorf: Econ.
- Stöss, Richard (1989). Die extreme Rechte in der Bundesrepublik. Opladen: Westdeutscher Verlag. ISBN 978-3-531-12124-6.
- Telesko, Werner (2004). Erlösermythen in Kunst und Politik: Zwischen christlicher Tradition und Moderne. Vienna: Böhlau. ISBN 978-3-205-77149-4.
- Thamer, Hans-Ulrich (2011). "Der tote Hitler: Das Ende des Diktators und die Wandlungen eines Mythos". In Großbölting, Thomas; Schmidt, Rüdiger (eds.). Der Tod des Diktators: Ereignis und Erinnerung im 20. Jahrhundert. Göttingen: Vandenhoeck & Ruprecht. ISBN 978-3-525-30009-1.
- Time (5 April 1954). "GERMANY: Among the Souvenirs". Time.
- Time (19 April 1971). "WEST GERMANY: Bidding for Adolf". Time.
- Weitzman, Mark (2006). "Antisemitismus und Holocaustleugnung: Permanente Elemente des globalen Rechtsextremismus". In Greven, Thomas; Grumke, Thomas (eds.). Globalisierter Rechtsextremismus? Die extremistische Rechte in der Ära der Globalisierung. Wiesbaden: Springer. ISBN 978-3-531-14514-3.
- Whiting, Charles (1996) [1973]. The Hunt for Martin Bormann: The Truth. London: Pen & Sword. ISBN 978-0-8505-2527-4.
- Wistrich, Robert S. (2001). Hitler and the Holocaust. New York: Modern Library. ISBN 978-0-679-64222-0.
