= DNB =

DNB may refer to:

- The Dictionary of National Biography, a reference work on notable figures from British history
- Diplomate of National Board, an Indian credential for healthcare providers
- Drum and bass (DnB), an electronic music style
- Dunbartonshire, historic county in Scotland, Chapman code
- Diplôme national du brevet, the first French secondary school diploma

== Organizations ==
- German National Library (German: Deutsche Nationalbibliothek) a central library and national bibliographic centre for Germany
- Dance Notation Bureau, a non-profit organization founded to preserve choreographic works
- De Nederlandsche Bank, the Dutch central bank
- Deutsches Nachrichtenbüro, a Nazi German news agency administered by Heinz Lorenz
- DNB ASA, a Norwegian financial services group
  - Den norske Bank (DnB), a former Norwegian bank, now part of DNB ASA
- Dun & Bradstreet (NYSE ticker symbol DNB), an American business information company

== Science and technology ==
- Departure from nucleate boiling, in boiling heat transfer
- The Day/Night Band, the high sensitivity channel of the Visible Infrared Imaging Radiometer Suite (VIIRS) on board the Suomi NPP and Joint Polar Satellite System (JPSS) series satellites capable of night time imaging.

== See also ==
- DNB Arena (disambiguation)
