= Theodor Morell =

Personal physician to Adolf Hitler (1886–1948)

- Undated photograph
- Born: Theodor Karl Ludwig Gilbert Morell; 22 July 1886; Trais-Münzenberg, Grand Duchy of Hesse, German Empire
- Died: 26 May 1948 (aged 61); Tegernsee, Bavaria, Allied-occupied Germany
- Education: University of Giessen; Heidelberg University; Ludwig-Maximilians-Universität München
- Occupation: Physician
- Employer: Adolf Hitler
- Known for: Service as Adolf Hitler's personal physician
- Spouse: Johanna "Hanni" Moller (m. 1919–1948)

Theodor "Theo" Karl Ludwig Gilbert Morell (22 July 1886 – 26 May 1948) was a German medical doctor known for acting as Adolf Hitler's personal physician. Morell was well known in Germany for his unconventional treatments. He assisted Hitler daily in virtually everything he did for several years and was beside Hitler until the last stages of the Battle of Berlin. Hitler granted Morell high awards, enabling him to become a multi-millionaire through business deals with the Nazi government, made possible by his status.

== Early life and education ==
Morell was the second son of a primary school teacher, born and raised in the small village of Trais-Münzenberg in Upper Hesse. He studied medicine at the University of Giessen (1 semester), Heidelberg University (5 semesters), and the Ludwig-Maximilians-Universität München (2 semesters), interrupted by a semester abroad at the University of Grenoble and the University of Paris. On 23 May 1913, he completed his medical doctorate degree under Albert Döderlein, and was fully licensed as a physician.

He served as a ship's doctor until 1914 when he volunteered for service at the Front during the First World War. Morell served as an army battalion medical officer until 1917. By 1918, he was in Berlin with his own medical practice, and in August 1919 he married Johanna "Hanni" Moller (1898–1983), a wealthy actress. He furnished his office with the latest medical technology through his wife's fortune. He targeted his unconventional treatments at an upscale market, his practice becoming fashionable for treatment of skin and venereal diseases, and he turned down invitations to be the personal physician to both the Shah of Persia and the King of Romania.

== Career ==
=== Hitler's physician ===
Morell joined the Nazi Party when Hitler came to power in 1933. In 1935, Hitler's personal photographer, Heinrich Hoffmann, was successfully treated by Morell. Hoffmann told Hitler that Morell had saved his life. Hitler met Morell in 1936, and Morell began treating Hitler with various commercial preparations, including a combination of vitamins and hydrolyzed strain of E. coli bacteria called Mutaflor (probiotic strain, isolated in 1917), which successfully treated Hitler's severe stomach cramps. Through Morell's prescriptions, a leg rash that Hitler had developed also disappeared. Hitler was convinced of Morell's medical genius, and Morell became part of his social inner circle.

Some historians have attempted to explain this by citing the reputation he had gained in Germany for success in treating syphilis, along with Hitler's own (speculated) fears of the disease, which he associated closely with Jews. Others have commented on the possibility that Hitler had visible signs of Parkinson's disease, especially towards the end of the war.

Hitler recommended Morell to others of the Nazi leadership, but most of them, including Hermann Göring and Heinrich Himmler, dismissed Morell as a quack. As Albert Speer related in his autobiography:

In 1936, when my circulation and stomach rebelled...I called at Morell's private office. After a superficial examination, Morell prescribed for me his intestinal bacteria, dextrose, vitamins and hormone tablets. For safety's sake I afterward had a thorough examination by Professor von Bergmann, the specialist in internal medicine at Berlin University. I was not suffering from any organic trouble, he concluded, but only from nervous symptoms caused by overwork. I slowed down my pace as best I could and the symptoms abated. To avoid offending Hitler I pretended that I was carefully following Morell's instructions, and since my health improved, I became for a time Morell's showpiece. – Albert Speer, Inside the Third Reich (1969)

When Hitler was troubled with grogginess in the morning, Morell would inject him with a solution of water mixed with a substance from several small, gold-foiled packets, which he called "Vitamultin". In 1943, Ernst-Günther Schenck, Nutrition Inspector for the Waffen SS and the Wehrmacht, became suspicious of the substance. Believing it was possibly inert or made up of diluted ingredients he sent some to the nutrition inspector's office for testing. The report he received indicated the substance did contain certain vitamins but also methamphetamine, a substance known even then to be highly addictive and strictly controlled as a result. Schenck showed the results to Reich Health Leader Dr. Leonardo Conti who informed Heinrich Himmler. Himmler's response was that the matter should be dropped immediately.

Speer characterized Morell as an opportunist who, once he achieved status as Hitler's physician, became extremely careless and lazy in his work. By 1944, Morell developed a hostile rivalry with Dr. Karl Brandt, who had been attending Hitler since 1934. Though criticized by Brandt and other physicians, Morell was always "restored to favor".

Morell was not popular with Hitler's entourage, who complained about the doctor's crude table manners, poor hygiene, and body odor. Hitler is said to have responded, "I do not employ him for his fragrance, but to look after my health." Hermann Göring called Morell Der Reichsspritzenmeister, ("Reich Master of Injections"), and variations on that theme, implying that Morell resorted to using drug injections when faced with medical problems and overused them.

=== Substances administered to Hitler ===
Morell kept a medical diary of the drugs, tonics, vitamins, and other substances he administered to Hitler, usually by injection (up to 20 times per day) or in pill form. Most were commercial preparations; some were Morell's own mixes. Since some of these compounds are considered toxic, historians have speculated that Morell inadvertently contributed to Hitler's deteriorating health. The incomplete list (below) of some 74 substances (in 28 different mixtures) administered to Hitler include psychoactive drugs such as heroin as well as commercial poisons. Among the compounds, in alphabetical order, were:

1. Brom-Nervacit: Bromide, sodium diethylbarbiturate, Pyramidon, since August 1941, a spoonful of this tranquilizer almost every night, to counteract stimulation from methamphetamine and to allow sleep.
2. Cardiazol and Coramine: since 1941 for leg oedema.
3. Chineurin: Quinine-containing preparation for common colds and flu.
4. Cocaine and adrenaline (via eye drops).
5. Coramine: Nikethamide injected when unduly sedated with barbiturates. In addition, Morell would use Coramine as part of an all-purpose "tonic".
6. Cortiron: Desoxycorticosterone acetate IM injections for muscle weaknesses, influencing carbon hydrate metabolism.
7. Doktor Koster's Antigaspills: 2–4 pills before every meal, for a total of 8–16 tablets a day, since 1936 Belladonna extractum and Strychnos nux vomica in high doses, for meteorism.
8. Enbasin: Sulfonamide, intragluteal 5 cc, for diverse infections.
9. Euflat: Bile extract, Radix Angelica, Aloes, papaverine, caffeine, pancreatine, Fel tauri - pills, for meteorism, and treatment of digestion disorders.
10. Eukodal: heavy doses oxycodone, for intestinal spasms, painkiller.
11. Eupaverin: Moxaverine, an isoquinoline derivative for intestinal spasms and colics.
12. Glucose: 1938 until 1940 every third day Glucose injections 5 and 10%, for potentiation of the Strophanthus effect.
13. Glyconorm: Metformin, metabolism enzymes (cozymase I and II), amino acids, vitamins – injectable solution as a strengthener tonic.
14. Homatropin: Homatropine HBr 0.1 g, NaCl 0.08 g; Distilled water added 10 mL. Eye drops for right eye problems.
15. Intelan: Twice a day Vitamins A, D_{3} and B_{12} – tablets as a strengthener, tonic.
16. Camomilla Officinale: Chamomile – intestinal enemata, on the patient's personal request.
17. Luitzym: After each meal, enzymes with cellulase, hemicellulases, amylase, and proteases, for intestinal problems, meteorism.
18. Mutaflor: Emulsion of Escherichia coli strains – enteric coated tablets for improvement of intestinal flora. They were prescribed to Hitler for flatulence in 1936, the first unorthodox drug treatment from Morell; bacteria cultured from human feces, see: "E. coli".
19. Omnadin: Mixture of protein compounds, biliary lipids and animal fat, taken at the onset of infections (together with Vitamultin).
20. Optalidon: Caffeine, propyphenazone – tablets at the beginning of infections (together with Vitamultin).
21. Orchikrin: An extract of bovine testosterone, pituitary gland, and glycerophosphate, as a tonic, strengthener. Marketed also as an aphrodisiac.
22. Penicilline-Hamma: Penicillin – powder topical antibiotic. After the attempted assassination of 20 July 1944 to treat his right arm.
23. Pervitin: methamphetamine injections for mental depression and fatigue.
24. Progynon B-Oleosum: Estradiol benzoate, benzoic ester of follicle hormone, for improvement of the circulation in the gastric mucosa.
25. Prostacrinum: Two ampoules every second day for a short period in '43, extract of seminal vesicles and prostate – injected IM for mental depression.
26. Prostophanta: Strophantine 0.3 mg, glucose, vitamin B, nicotinic acid – IM heart glycoside, strengthener.
27. Septoid: intravenous injections of 10 cc of 3% iodine (in potassium iodide form) with 10 cc of 20% glucose, two or three times a day, to improve heart's condition and the altered Second Sound.
28. Strophantin: 1941–44 – cycle of 2 weeks of homeopathic Strophanthus gratus glycoside 0.2 mg per day for coronary sclerosis.
29. Sympatol: oxedrine tartrate since 1942, 10 drops daily for increasing the cardiac minute volume.
30. Testoviron: Testosterone propionate as a tonic, strengthener.
31. Tonophosphan: 1942–1944, phosphoric preparation – SC tonic, strengthener.
32. Ultraseptyl: Sulfonamide for respiratory infections.
33. Veritol: since March 1944 hydroxyphenyl-2-methylamino-propane – eyedrops for left eye treatment.
34. Vitamultin-Calcium: Caffeine, vitamins.

An almost complete listing of the drugs used by Morell, wrote historian Hugh Trevor-Roper, was compiled after the war from his meticulous daily records and unlikely to have been exaggerated. Morrell was trained as a general practitioner. However, his specialty was training neither in dermatology nor venereology but in obstetrics and gynecology. Despite his lack of training, Morrell did treat Hitler (who had an obsessive fear of VD) with Arsenobenzol, designated "606", salvarsan, neosalvarsan with bismuth and iodine salts.

=== World War II ===
In 1939, Morell inadvertently became involved with the invasion of Czechoslovakia. The Czechoslovak president, Emil Hacha, became so scared at Hitler's outburst that he fainted. Morell injected stimulants into Hacha to wake him, and although he claimed that these were only vitamins, they may have included methamphetamine. Hacha soon gave in to Hitler's demands.

When Reinhard Heydrich, who was serving as Reich Protector of Bohemia and Moravia – the rump left of Czechoslovakia after Hitler annexed it – was the victim of an assassination attempt in May 1942, Morell was one of the doctors brought in by Heinrich Himmler to treat the badly-wounded SS man. Heinrich Himmler's chief doctor, Karl Gebhardt, ignored his recommendation to use antibiotics; gangrene set in, and Heydrich died a week later.

After the 20 July 1944 assassination attempt against Hitler, Morell treated him with topical penicillin, which had only recently been introduced into testing by the U.S. Army. Where he acquired it is unknown, and Morell claimed complete ignorance of penicillin when American intelligence officers interrogated him after the war. When members of Hitler's inner circle were interviewed for the book The Bunker, some claimed Morell owned a significant share in a company fraudulently marketing a product as penicillin.

When Hitler developed jaundice in September 1944, Dr. Erwin Giesing – an ear, nose and throat specialist who had initially been brought in to treat the dictator after the damage done to his eardrums from the bomb explosion of the 20 July plot – began to be suspicious of Morell's treatment of Hitler. Suspecting that he knew the cause of the jaundice, Giesing deliberately dosed himself with some of the "Dr. Koester's Anti-Gas Pills", which Morell had Hitler taking in large numbers every day, and found that they had mildly harmful effects. Having them analyzed, he found they contained strychnine and belladonna, the strychnine being the cause of the jaundice. Giesing reported his results to two of Hitler's other doctors, Karl Brandt and Hanskarl von Hasselbach, who in turn told other members of Hitler's retinue. When word of this finally reached Hitler, he was furious. Declaring that he had total faith in Morell and his treatments, he dismissed all three doctors – Giesing, Brandt, and Hasselbach – even though the latter two had been with him since his early days in power. Several months later, Brandt was imprisoned and condemned to death at the Nuremberg trials.

By April 1945, Hitler was taking many pills a day, along with numerous injections. The personal notes of Morell describe how he treated Hitler over the years, including notations such as, "injection as always", and, "Eukodal", an early German trade name for the opioid oxycodone.

Morell was one of the occupants of the Führerbunker, located in the garden of the Reich Chancellery, once Hitler and his entourage relocated there from the Wolf's Lair in Rastenburg in East Prussia. As the Battle of Berlin progressed and the outlook became dire, it was Morell who provided the cyanide capsules which Eva Braun would later use to kill herself, and which Joseph Goebbels and his wife Magda used to murder their six children before killing themselves.

On 20 April 1945, Hitler ordered Morell, Albert Bormann, Admiral Karl-Jesko von Puttkamer, Dr. Hugo Blaschke, secretaries Johanna Wolf, Christa Schroeder, and several others to leave the bunker and Berlin by aircraft for the Obersalzberg. Hitler told Morell he did not need any more medical help, although he continued to take many of the medications Morell had prescribed for him; during the last week of Hitler's life, it was administered by Dr. Werner Haase and by Heinz Linge, Hitler's valet. The group flew out of Berlin on different flights by aircraft of the Fliegerstaffel des Führers over the following three days. Morell was on the flight which left Berlin on 23 April.

== Personal awards and wealth ==
Hitler awarded Morell the title of Professor and gave him the Golden Party Badge and the Knights Cross of the War Merit Cross. Morell was able to use his relationship with Hitler to sell his "Vitamultin" to the German Labor Front and his delousing product "Rußla powder" to the Wehrmacht. In addition to an annual salary of 60,000 ℛ︁ℳ︁, these business ventures earned Morell a fortune of about seven million Reichsmark.

== Final years and death ==
Morell was captured by American forces and interrogated on 18 May 1945. One of his interrogators was reportedly "disgusted" by his obesity and lack of hygiene. Although he was held in an American internment camp on the site of the former Dachau concentration camp and questioned because of his proximity to Hitler, Morell was never charged with a crime. Grossly obese and suffering from poor health, he died in a Tegernsee hospital on 26 May 1948.

== See also ==
- Adolf Hitler's health
