= Fritz Darges =

German SS officer (1913–2009)

- Darges, c. 1945
- Born: 8 February 1913; Dülseberg, Kingdom of Prussia, German Empire
- Died: 25 October 2009 (aged 96); Celle, Germany
- Military career
- Allegiance: Nazi Germany
- Branch: Waffen-SS
- Service years: 1933–1945
- Rank: SS-Obersturmbannführer
- Units: SS Division Das Reich; SS Division Wiking; Führerbegleitkommando
- Conflicts: World War II
- Awards: Knight's Cross of the Iron Cross

Fritz Darges (8 February 1913 – 25 October 2009) was a German SS-Obersturmbannführer (lieutenant colonel) in the Waffen-SS during World War II. He served as an adjutant to Martin Bormann and later was a personal adjutant to Adolf Hitler. He was awarded the Knight's Cross of the Iron Cross during his time serving in the Eastern Front.

== Early life ==
He was born in Dülseberg near Salzwedel. After attending school, Darges volunteered to join the SS in April 1933. By 1934, he had been selected to become an officer and attended the SS-Junkerschule at Bad Tölz. After graduation in April 1935, he was promoted to SS-Untersturmführer (second lieutenant). In 1936, he was named Adjutant to Reichsleiter Martin Bormann. In May 1937, he joined the Nazi Party, and in September of that same year he was promoted to SS-Obersturmführer (first lieutenant).

== World War II ==
In October 1939, he returned to the Waffen-SS as a company commander in the Deutschland and Der Führer Regiments in the SS-VT. He fought in the Battle of France and was awarded the Iron Cross 2nd class in July 1940 and promoted to SS-Hauptsturmführer (captain).

Darges was then posted to the newly formed SS Division Wiking, took part in Operation Barbarossa and was awarded the Iron Cross 1st class in August 1942. In March 1943, he became a personal adjutant to Adolf Hitler. He was assigned to the Führerbegleitkommando, an SS bodyguard unit that provided personal security for Hitler. He was promoted to SS-Obersturmbannführer (lieutenant colonel) in January 1944.

=== Dismissal ===
On 18 or 19 July 1944, just before the 20 July plot, during a strategy conference at the Wolfsschanze, a fly began buzzing around the room, allegedly landing on Hitler's shoulder and on the surface of a map several times, irritating Hitler. One version of the story states that Hitler ordered Darges to dispatch the nuisance; Darges suggested that, as it was an airborne pest, the job should go to the Luftwaffe adjutant Nicolaus von Below. Rochus Misch later stated that Hitler noticed Darges, with his hands in his pockets, snickering when he looked up from the map. Darges himself claims it was due to his inattention to Hitler's original order to drive flies out of the room. All versions agree that Hitler immediately took Darges aside, dismissed him, and had him transferred to the Eastern Front.

=== Service on the Eastern Front ===
In August 1944, Darges returned to the SS Division Wiking to replace Johannes Mühlenkamp as the commander of the 5th SS Panzer Regiment. It was in command of this unit that Darges was awarded the Knight's Cross for his actions on the night of 4 January 1945. The division was advancing towards Bicske when it was stopped by the 41st Guards Rifle Division of the Soviet 4th Guards Army. Darges initially probed the Soviet line with a mixed Panzer and Panzer Grenadier Kampfgruppe and succeeded in breaking through the line at dawn. Subsequently, he ambushed and destroyed a Soviet task force, knocking out four 122mm guns, four 76mm anti-tank guns, twelve trucks and a number of supply vehicles. He then attacked Regis Castle, forcing the garrison to retreat. Darges then found himself surrounded by Soviet reinforcements and was forced to repel several attacks. Three days later when they were relieved by another Kampfgruppe from SS Wiking, they left behind more than thirty destroyed Soviet tanks.

== Post-war ==
After the war, Darges was interned by U.S. military authorities. He was released in 1948. Not much is known about his activities after Germany's surrender. He had a career as a car salesman after the war. He appeared in the 2000 documentary Hitlers Krieg im Osten, credited as himself.

Shortly before his death, Darges stated that he found Hitler to be a genius and that "I served him and would do it all again now." Darges authored a manuscript recounting his experiences as a member of Hitler's inner circle, with instructions that it be published after his death.

He died on 25 October 2009 at his home in Celle and was buried there.
