= Karl-Jesko von Puttkamer =

German admiral and naval adjutant to Adolf Hitler (1900–1981)

- Puttkamer in 1943
- Born: 24 March 1900; Frankfurt (Oder), German Empire
- Died: 4 March 1981 (aged 80); Munich, West Germany
- Burial place: Munich Waldfriedhof
- Military career
- Allegiance: German Empire; Weimar Republic; Nazi Germany
- Branch: Kriegsmarine
- Service years: 1917–1945
- Rank: Konteradmiral
- Commands: Albatros; Z10 Hans Lody
- Conflicts: World War I World War II

Karl-Jesko Otto Robert von Puttkamer (24 March 1900 – 4 March 1981) was a German admiral who was naval adjutant to Adolf Hitler during World War II.

== Military service ==
Puttkamer was born in Frankfurt (Oder) and was a member of the Puttkamer family, related to Otto von Bismarck's wife. He joined the Imperial German Navy as an officer cadet in 1917 and served on a heavy cruiser in World War I. Puttkamer enlisted during World War I on 2 July 1917 as a volunteer in the Imperial Navy's Seeoffizierslaufbahn regiment.

In December 1917 Puttkamer served on the battleship Kaiserin. In the final months of the war, Puttkamer graduated at the Naval Academy Mürwik in a navigation course. He then took leave and joined the Freikorps. In September 1920 Puttkamer returned to the Naval Academy. He was commissioned as an officer in 1923.

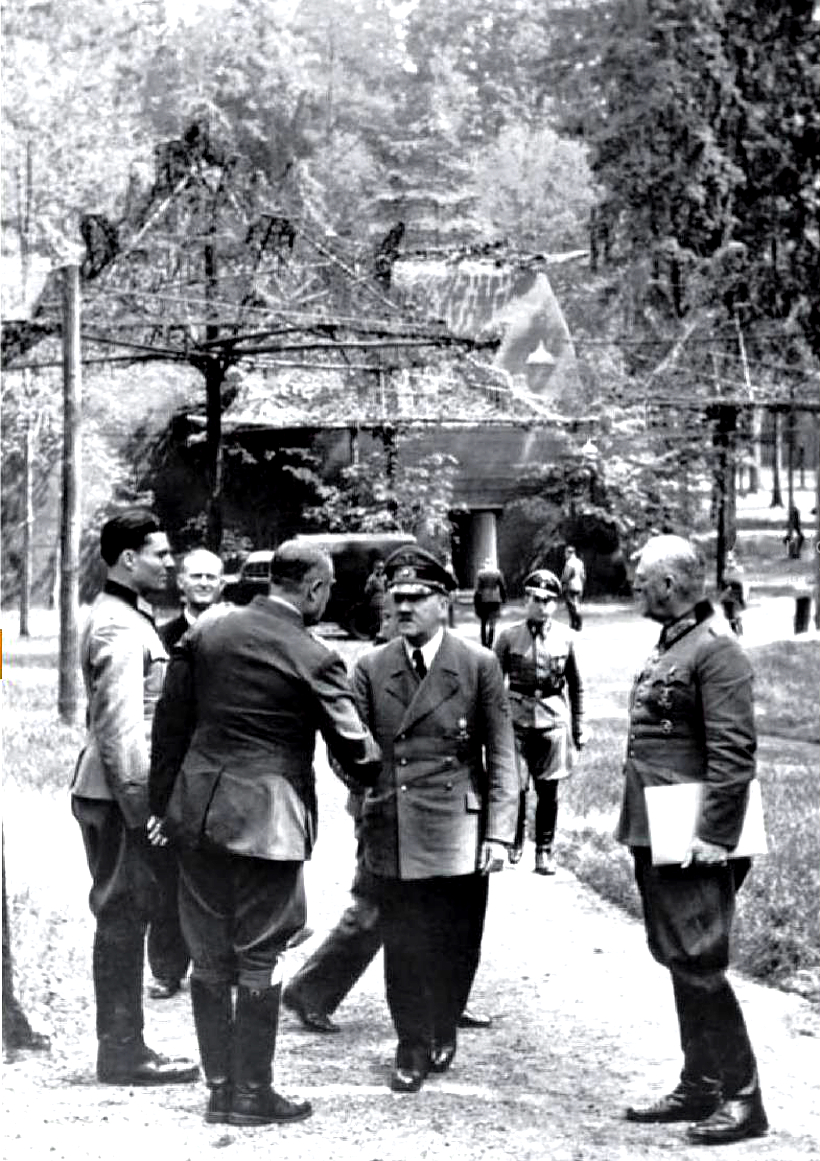
Wolf's Lair, 15 July 1944, Puttkamer is the second from the left on the right of Claus von Stauffenberg; Hitler and Wilhelm Keitel are on the right.

In September 1926, Puttkamer became commander of the torpedo boat Albatros under Karl Dönitz, a position he held until October 1930, where he was promoted to lieutenant-commander of the torpedo boat Adler. In 1933 graduated as a naval liaison officer from the Mürwik Naval Academy. Shortly after this, he served as naval adjutant to the General Staff until June 1935. In July 1935, he was transferred to the staff of the Commander-in-Chief of the Navy. Puttkamer served as Hitler's naval adjutant until June 1938, when he was transferred to active service.

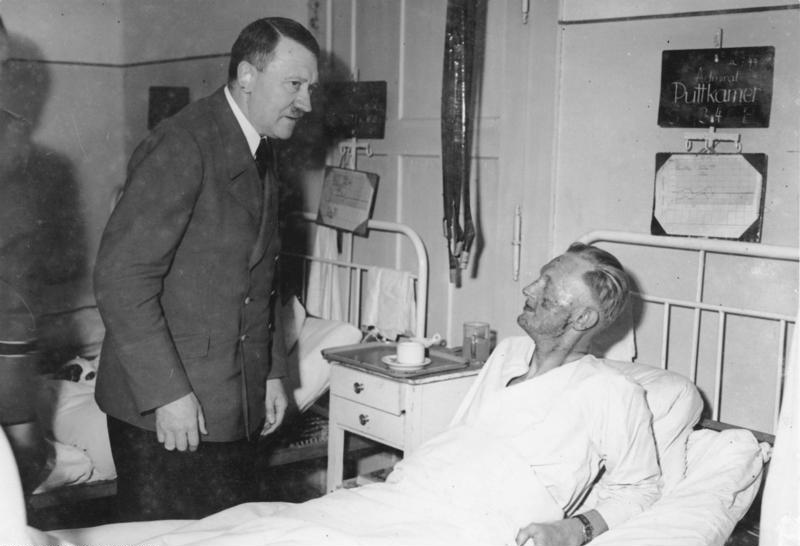
End July 1944, Hitler visiting Puttkamer in the hospital after the failed 20 July plot

Immediately prior to the outbreak of World War II in Europe, he was the captain of a destroyer. After the war began, he returned to the role of naval adjutant to Hitler. Later in September 1943 he was promoted to Konteradmiral. Puttkamer was injured on 20 July 1944 when the bomb exploded during the 20 July plot attempt to kill Hitler and was awarded the 20 July Wound Badge.

== 1945 ==
On 20 April 1945, Hitler told his staff: "The situation during the last few days has changed to such an extent that I am forced to reduce my staff."

On 20 April, Puttkamer, Dr. Theodor Morell, Dr. Hugo Blaschke, Albert Bormann, secretaries Johanna Wolf, Christa Schroeder and several others were ordered by Hitler to leave Berlin by aircraft for the Obersalzberg. The group flew out of Berlin on different flights by aircraft of the Fliegerstaffel des Führers over the following three days. Puttkamer's flight left Berlin on 21 April. Puttkamer was ordered to the Berghof to destroy Hitler's papers and personal belongings there. Therefore, Puttkamer was not with Hitler during his final few days in the Führerbunker. Following the German surrender on 8 May 1945, Puttkamer was held in American captivity until May 1947.

== Death ==
He died in 1981 in Munich. He was buried at Waldfriedhof, in Munich.
