= Albert Bormann =

German Nazi paramilitary officer (1902–1989)

- Born: 2 September 1902; Halberstadt, Province of Saxony, Kingdom of Prussia, German Empire
- Died: 8 April 1989 (aged 86); Munich, West Germany
- Relatives: Martin Bormann (brother)
- Military career
- Allegiance: Germany (1933–1945)
- Branch: National Socialist Motor Corps (1931–1945)
- Service years: 1931–1945
- Rank: NSKK-Gruppenführer
- Unit: Hitler's Chancellery
- Commands: Chief of Main Office I: Persönliche Angelegenheiten des Führers (Personal Affairs of the Führer)
- Awards: Golden Party Badge

Albert Bormann (2 September 1902 – 8 April 1989) was a German Nazi Party official who served as a personal adjutant to Adolf Hitler and as the chief of a main office in Hitler's Chancellery. He reached the general rank of Gruppenführer in the National Socialist Motor Corps (NSKK) during World War II. He was the younger brother of Martin Bormann, private secretary to Adolf Hitler and chief of the Nazi Party Chancellery.

== Early life and education ==
Bormann was born on 2 September 1902 in Halberstadt (now in Saxony-Anhalt) in the Kingdom of Prussia in the German Empire. He was the son of Theodor Bormann (1862–1903), a post office employee, and his second wife, Antonie Bernhardine Mennong. The family was Lutheran. He had two half-siblings (Else and Walter Bormann) from his father's earlier marriage to Louise Grobler, who died in 1898. Antonie Bormann gave birth to three sons, one of whom died in infancy. Albert and his older brother, Martin (1900–1945), survived to adulthood. Theodor died when Bormann was one and his mother soon remarried. After completing Realschule and obtaining his Abitur in Weimar, Bormann worked as a bank clerk from 1922 to 1931.

== Nazi career ==
In 1927, Bormann joined the Sturmabteilung (SA), the Nazi paramilitary organization and, on April 27, he joined the Nazi Party (NSDAP membership number 60,507). He was the Gauführer of the Hitler Youth in Thuringia from 1929 to 1931. In April 1931, Martin Bormann gained his brother a job with the Nazi Party Relief Fund in Munich. By October 1931, Bormann was assigned to Kanzlei des Führers (Hitler's Chancellery). It was responsible for the Nazi Party and associated organizations and their dealings directly with Adolf Hitler. After rising to the rank of SA-Sturmbannführer, Bormann left the SA and joined the National Socialist Motor Corps (NSKK) where he eventually was promoted to NSKK-Gruppenführer. Bormann was different from his older brother, Martin. He was tall, cultured and "avoided the limelight". Bormann believed he was serving the greater good and did not use his position for personal gain. He became friends with SS-Obergruppenführer Philipp Bouhler, the chief of Hitler's Chancellery (Der Chef der Kanzlei des Führers der NSDAP).

Hitler was fond of Bormann and found him to be trustworthy. In 1938, Bormann was assigned to a small group of adjutants who were not subordinate to Martin Bormann. The relationship between Martin and Albert became so caustic that Martin referred to him not even by name but as "the man who holds the Führer's coat".

Later in 1938, Bormann became Chief of Main Office I: Persönliche Angelegenheiten des Führers (Personal Affairs of the Führer) of the Kanzlei des Führers. In that job Bormann handled much of Hitler's routine correspondence. Before being chosen as a private secretary for Hitler, Traudl Junge worked for Bormann in that office after she came to Berlin. At the 1938 parliamentary election, Bormann was elected to the Reichstag for electoral constituency 2 (Berlin-West) and retained this seat until the fall of the Nazi regime.

On 20 April 1945, during the Battle of Berlin, Bormann, Admiral Karl-Jesko von Puttkamer, Theodor Morell, Hugo Blaschke, secretaries Johanna Wolf, Christa Schroeder and several others were ordered by Hitler to leave Berlin by aircraft for the Obersalzberg. The group flew out of Berlin on different flights on aircraft of the Fliegerstaffel des Führers over the following three days. Bormann stayed with his family at the Hotel Post in Hintersee, a couple of miles from Berchtesgaden. Because he was Martin's brother, he thought it was safer for his family not to stay there too long. In late May 1945 a US Army intelligence officer arrived at the hotel looking for Albert Bormann. By then Bormann was gone but Schroeder was still there and taken away for questioning on 28 May.

== Post-war ==
After the end of World War II in Europe, Bormann went by the name Roth. He worked on a farm until April 1949, when he was arrested. He was sentenced by a Munich de-nazification court to six months’ hard labor, being released in October 1949. Bormann disliked his brother Martin to such an extent that he did not even wish to discuss him in interviews after the war. Furthermore Bormann refused to write his memoirs. In April 1989 Bormann died while living in Munich.

== Awards and decorations ==
- Golden Party Badge
- Nazi Party Long Service Award in Bronze and Silver

== In fiction ==
- The Bormann Brief by Clive Egleton
- Prussian Blue by Philip Kerr

== See also ==
- List of Nazi Party leaders and officials
