= Willy Johannmeyer =

German military officer (1915–1970)

- Born: 27 July 1915; Iserlohn, Province of Westphalia, Kingdom of Prussia, German Empire
- Died: 14 April 1970 (aged 54); Kelkheim, Hessen, West Germany
- Military career
- Allegiance: Nazi Germany
- Branch: German Army; Schutzstaffel
- Service years: 1933-1945
- Rank: Oberstleutnant
- Service number: SS Member No. 262992^{[a]}
- Commands: 2nd Company, 14th Company, 2nd Battalion of the 503rd Infantry Regiment
- Conflicts: World War II; Invasion of France; Operation Barbarossa; Leningrad Front
- Awards: Knight's Cross of the Iron Cross with Oak Leaves

Willy Johannmeyer (27 July 1915 – 14 April 1970) was a German officer during World War II who served from 1939 to 1945. He was also a recipient of the Knight's Cross of the Iron Cross with Oak Leaves, and at the time of the dissolution of Nazi Germany, the last adjutant to Adolf Hitler of the army (Heeresadjutant).

== Career ==
Johannmeyer was born in Iserlohn, Westphalia, on 27 July 1915. After Adolf Hitler's rise to power in 1933, he joined the Schutzstaffel (SS), No. 262992. In 1936, he was assigned to the 64th Infantry Regiment as Cadet (Fahnenjunker) and within 2 years, he rose to the rank of Leutnant.

=== World War II ===
On the Eastern Front, the 503rd Infantry Regiment was involved in the defensive battle of Nevel (south of Pskov Oblast, near Belorussia). In this sector, Johannmeyer distinguished himself with notable action during the fighting in March 1943, and was awarded the 329th Oak Leaves (Eichenlaub) to the Knight's Cross on 18 November 1943.

On 25 November, his battalion attacked Soviet positions near the town of Sergeytsevo (northwest of Nevel) with the aid of the 502nd Heavy Tank Battalion in a forest. Otto Carius, a Tiger I tank commander of the battalion, recalled in his memoirs that Johannmeyer was struck by sniper fire in the lungs from a Soviet marksman hidden in tree foliage. Initially, Johannmeyer was thought to have a limited chance of survival, but he managed to survive. Carius wrote 'he was relieved to hear from Johannmeyer while he was in hospital in 1944'. Johannmeyer was absent from his official Oak Leaves award ceremony as his condition was still considered critical. Shortly thereafter, on 1 December, Johamnmeyer was promoted to the rank of major.

On 1 March 1944, Johannmeyer was called to a training course for senior officer adjutants, and 3 months later was transferred to the OKH (Oberkommando des Heeres, Army High Command). From August 1944 onwards, he served in the Army Personnel department (Heerespersonalamt), with the rank of Oberstleutnant i.G. (im Generalstab).

=== Hitler's adjutant ===
In 1945, Johannmeyer was transferred to the Führerhauptquartier (FHQ) in Berlin, located at the time in the Reich Chancellery, as Army Adjutant (Heeresadjutant), replacing Heinrich Borgmann. Johannmeyer was present at the conferences held twice a day (3:00 pm and at midnight) in the Chancellery's greenhouse, and later at those held in the Führerbunker.

On Hitler's order, Johannmeyer flew to East Prussia to "clarify" the situation developing as the Soviets advanced through the Baltic States. Hitler always considered reports by army generals unrealistic, and refusing to accept that the Eastern Front was collapsing, relied on his adjutants to relay "positive news". Johannmeyer, upon his return, reported that the army was in an alarmingly desperate state, especially after the formation of the Courland pocket and the pocket around Königsberg. Hitler refused to allow any means of withdrawal. When Johannmeyer referred to the civilian deaths occurring due to the massive evacuation of the eastern territories, Hitler replied in anger:

I won't take this into consideration at all!

Johannmeyer was among the occupants of the Führerbunker, Hitler's underground headquarters in encircled Berlin. Johannmeyer was present at Hitler's last birthday ceremony on 20 April 1945. During the pre-dawn hours of 29 April, Hitler ordered that three copies of his political testament be hand-delivered to Field Marshal Ferdinand Schörner in Czechoslovakia, Karl Dönitz in Schleswig-Holstein, and the Brown House, Munich by Johannmeyer, Martin Bormann's adjutant SS-Standartenführer Wilhelm Zander, and deputy press attaché, Heinz Lorenz, respectively. The three men said their farewell to Hitler and were each handed a white dossier containing the testament by Bormann at approximately 4:00 am. Armed with automatic weapons, and in uniform, the trio left the bunker around 8.00 am, attempting to break through Soviet lines to deliver the documents to their respective objective.

Oberstleutnant Graßmann was tasked with ferrying Johannmeyer in a Fieseler Fi 156 Storch from Pfaueninsel, Wannsee, back to Field Marshal Schörner's headquarters. The plane took off at around midnight on 1–2 May 1945, but was unable to land in Berlin, due to being fired upon by Soviet Army troops.

== Post-war life ==
Johannmeyer made it back to Iserlohn. There Johannmeyer hid his copy of the documents by putting them in a container and burying it in his family's garden. He was arrested by American troops in 1945. After his release, he was engaged in industrial business, mainly in Agricultural Economics, and attained the diploma - Dipl. agr. He worked for the DEMAG subsidiary FMA Pokorny in Frankfurt am Main, Hessen, and became a member of the company's board of directors. Johannmeyer died in 1970.

== Awards ==
- Iron Cross (1939) 2nd Class (10 June 1940) & 1st Class (29 June 1940)
- Knight's Cross of the Iron Cross with Oak Leaves
  - Knight's Cross on 16 May 1942 as Oberleutnant and commander of II./Infanterie-Regiment 503
  - 329th Oak Leaves 18 November 1943 as Hauptmann and commander of II./Infanterie-Regiment 503
