= Hugo Blaschke =

Adolf Hitler's dentist (1881–1959)

- Blaschke c. 1948
- Born: 14 November 1881; Neustadt in West Prussia, German Empire
- Died: 6 December 1959 (aged 78); Nuremberg, Bavaria, West Germany
- Occupation: Dental surgeon
- Employer: Adolf Hitler
- Known for: Hitler's personal dentist

Hugo Johannes Blaschke (14 November 1881 – 6 December 1959) was a German dental surgeon notable for being Adolf Hitler's personal dentist from 1933 to April 1945 and for being the chief dentist on the staff of Reichsführer-SS Heinrich Himmler.

== Life ==
Blaschke was born in Neustadt in West Prussia, now Wejherowo, and studied dentistry in Berlin and at the University of Pennsylvania. He trained as a dental surgeon in London and opened his own practice in late 1911. During World War I, he served as a military dentist in Frankfurt/Oder and in Berlin. After the war ended, he went back to private practice in Berlin.

After treating Hermann Göring in 1930, Blaschke began seeing other top Nazi leaders for dental work. Blaschke then joined the Nazi Party on 1 February 1931. Göring recommended him to Hitler in 1933, when Blaschke installed a gold bridge in the dictator's upper jaw. After successfully treating him, Blaschke became Hitler's personal dentist. In addition to Hitler, he treated Eva Braun, Joseph Goebbels, and Heinrich Himmler.

In early May 1935, Blaschke joined the Schutzstaffel (SS), which supplied looted gold for him to use in fillings. Around 1938, he employed Käthe Heusermann as his dental assistant and Fritz Echtmann as his dental technician. Blaschke was appointed chief dentist of the SS on 31 August 1943. He was promoted to the rank of SS-Brigadeführer on 9 November 1944, around when he extracted one of Hitler's teeth.

In 1945, as the end of Nazi Germany drew near, Blaschke accompanied Hitler to the Reich Chancellery in Berlin and the Führerbunker. As the Soviet Red Army was closing in on Berlin, on 20 April, Hitler ordered Blaschke, Albert Bormann, Admiral Karl-Jesko von Puttkamer, Dr. Theodor Morell, secretaries Johanna Wolf, Christa Schroeder, and other staff to leave Berlin by aircraft for the Obersalzberg. The group flew out of Berlin on different flights by aircraft of the Fliegerstaffel des Führers over the following three days.

=== Post-war ===
On 9 May, Red Army soldiers captured Blaschke's dental assistant Käthe Heusermann, who was shown Hitler's and Eva Braun's dental remains. (Note: After Heusermann's release she told Western officials that Hitler's mandible had been "complete" although it was later shown (in a 1968 Soviet book) to be sundered at the depth of the teeth.) (Note: By 1981, Heusermann reportedly told forensic odontologist Reidar F. Sognnaes that a bridge used to identify Braun was made for her but never fitted.) On 11 May, Fritz Echtmann was also apprehended and described the remains. Both then spent about a decade in Soviet prisons.

Blaschke was arrested by United States Army troops in Dorfgastein, Austria, on 20 May 1945. (Note: According to a U.S. military intelligence document, he was arrested/interred in Salzburg on 28 May.) He was interrogated by the Americans after the war (including jurist Michael Musmanno in 1948) about Hitler's dental treatment as part of the effort to identify Hitler's remains. After his release in December 1948, Blaschke practiced dentistry in Nuremberg. He reconstructed the dental records of Martin Bormann from memory, and these were later used to identify Bormann's skeletal remains, which were discovered in Berlin in 1972. Blaschke died in Nuremberg in 1959. He was buried in St. Peter Cemetery in Nuremberg.
