= Wilhelm Zander =

German SS officer (1911–1974)

- Born: 22 April 1911; Saarbrücken, Kingdom of Bavaria, German Empire (now Saarland, Germany)
- Died: 27 September 1974 (aged 63); Munich, Bavaria, West Germany
- Military career
- Allegiance: Nazi Germany
- Branch: Schutzstaffel
- Service years: 1933 to 1945
- Rank: SS-Standartenführer
- Awards: SA Sports Badge, Iron Cross 2nd Class and 1st Class

Wilhelm Zander (22 April 1911 – 27 September 1974) was an adjutant to Martin Bormann during World War II. He died in Munich in 1974.

== Biography ==
He was born in Saarbrücken. Although he received only minimal education, Zander built up business interests in Italy. He abandoned these interests to take up a full-time post as a Nazi Party worker. In 1933, he joined the Schutzstaffel (SS) and later achieved the rank of SS-Standartenführer.

In early 1945, he accompanied Martin Bormann and German leader Adolf Hitler to the Führerbunker in Berlin. On 29 April 1945, during the Battle of Berlin, Hitler dictated his last will and political testament. Hitler then ordered that three copies be made and hand-delivered to Field Marshal Ferdinand Schörner in Czechoslovakia, the Brown House, Munich and Karl Dönitz in Schleswig-Holstein. Three messengers were assigned to take the will and political testament out of the besieged city of Berlin to ensure their presence for posterity. The couriers were Hitler's army adjutant, Willy Johannmeyer, deputy press attaché, Heinz Lorenz and Zander, respectively. The three men said their farewell to Hitler and were handed a white dossier with the testament by Bormann at approximately 4.00 am. Armed with automatic weapons and wearing helmets to break through Soviet lines, the men left the bunker around 8.00 am.

On 30 April 1945 as the Soviet Red Army closed in on the bunker complex, Hitler committed suicide. The three couriers continued their journey and made it through the Soviet Army encirclement of Berlin to the Elbe River.

== Post-war ==
Zander changed his identity, adopted the surname Paustin and worked as a gardener after the war in Europe ended. He hid his copy of the documents in a suitcase near Lake Tegernsee. Zander was arrested in the American occupation zone, and as a consequence, the copies of Hitler's will, testament, and wedding documents fell into the hands of the American and British forces. Thereafter, by January 1946, the texts of the documents were published in the American and British press.
