= Albert Zoller =

Albert Zoller was a French officer who, after World War II, interviewed Adolf Hitler's former secretary, Christa Schroeder, while she was put in detention. He was adjutant to the chief of the French military mission in Düsseldorf and had met Hermann Göring, whom he brought to Nuremberg and the trials. From the interviews with both Göring and Schroeder he then wrote Hitler, Private, a book that has been translated to other languages.
