= Doktor Koster's Antigaspills =

Alternative medication for flatulence

Doktor Koster's Antigaspills were an early-20th-century alternative medication intended to treat stomach upset and excessive flatulence. They are best known for being administered to Adolf Hitler by his physician, Theodor Morell, to treat Hitler's stomach ailments. Morrell, regarded as a quack by Hitler's associates, administered a wide variety of unorthodox concoctions and medications to Hitler beginning in 1936.

The pill's active ingredients consisted primarily of atropine (an extract of Atropa belladonna) and strychnine.
