= Alwin-Broder Albrecht =

German naval officer

- Albrecht wearing an NSKK Brigadeführer uniform
- Born: 18 September 1903; Sankt Peter-Ording, German Empire
- Died: 1 May 1945 (aged 41); Berlin, Nazi Germany
- Military career
- Allegiance: Weimar Republic; Nazi Germany
- Branch: Imperial German Navy; Kriegsmarine; NSKK
- Service years: 1922–1945
- Rank: NSKK-Brigadeführer
- Conflicts: Battle of Berlin

Alwin-Broder Albrecht (18 September 1903 – 1 May 1945) was a German naval officer who was one of Adolf Hitler's adjutants during World War II.

== Biography ==
He was born in Sankt Peter-Ording in the Province of Schleswig-Holstein. In 1922 he joined the Reichsmarine. On 1 June 1934, he was promoted to Kapitänleutnant. Then on 1 November 1937, he was promoted to the rank of Korvettenkapitän. When Hitler's liaison officer to the navy, Karl-Jesko von Puttkamer was transferred to active service on 19 June 1938, Albrecht took over that position.

However, on 30 June 1939, the Commander of the Navy Großadmiral Erich Raeder wanted him transferred to Tokyo as a military attaché or kicked out of the navy completely after it was discovered that Albrecht had married a woman "with a past" in early 1939. Hitler was against it; he had an argument with Raeder over the matter. On 1 July 1939, Hitler made Albrecht one of his personal adjutants. Albrecht was also appointed to general rank in the NSKK. Hitler went on to meet Albrecht's wife and liked her. Under Reichsleiter Philipp Bouhler, Albrecht remained on Hitler's staff and worked in the Reich Chancellery in Berlin.

In 1945, Albrecht spent time in the Führerbunker serving in his capacity as an adjutant to Hitler. During the Battle in Berlin, he was last seen defending Hitler's Reich Chancellery with a machine gun. He is believed to have committed suicide on 1 May 1945, aged 41. His body was never found.
