= DNB Arena =

DNB Arena may refer to:

- DNB Arena (Trondheim), a football stadium in Trondheim, Norway
- DNB Arena (Stavanger), an ice-hockey rink in Stavanger, Norway
