= Heinrich Borgmann =

German officer during World War II, injured by the 20 July plot bomb (1912–1945)

- Hitler visiting Borgmann in a hospital after the failed 20 July bomb in 1944
- Born: 15 August 1912; Angermünde
- Died: 5 April 1945 (aged 32); Magdeburg, Free State of Prussia, Nazi Germany
- Burial place: Waldfriedhof Dahlem
- Military career
- Allegiance: Weimar Republic; Nazi Germany
- Branch: Army
- Service years: 1932–1945
- Rank: Oberst
- Commands: Volksgrenadier-Division "Scharnhorst"
- Conflicts: World War II
- Awards: Knight's Cross of the Iron Cross with Oak Leaves

Heinrich Borgmann (15 August 1912 – 5 April 1945) was a German officer during World War II. He was seriously injured by the 20 July plot bomb planted by Colonel Claus von Stauffenberg at the Wolf's Lair headquarters in Rastenburg, East Prussia.

== Biography ==
Positions of participants at the 20 July conference; Borgmann (8) was standing close to the bomb.

He joined the infantry in 1932 and by the outbreak of World War II was a Hauptmann. He took part in the invasions of Poland in 1939 and France and he was awarded the Knights Cross of the Iron Cross (Ritterkreuz des Eisernen Kreuzes) for his role in the latter campaign on 19 July 1940. Borgmann was then posted to the Eastern Front and was awarded the Oak Leaves to the Knight's Cross of the Iron Cross on 11 February 1942 when serving with Infanterie-Regiment 46. He was promoted to major and appointed to the Army Staff at Adolf Hitler's headquarters as an adjutant in October 1943 and was then promoted to Oberstleutnant.

On 20 July 1944 he was standing at the end of the conference table close to von Stauffenberg's briefcase bomb. Generalleutnant Rudolf Schmundt and Oberst Heinz Brandt who were standing to his left and stenographer Heinz Berger to his right were all killed by the explosion, but Borgmann survived with serious injuries. After recovering he was posted to an infantry division as an Oberst. He was appointed commander of the Volksgrenadier-Division "Scharnhorst". Borgmann was killed during a low-level air attack on his staff car in April 1945.

== Awards ==
- Iron Cross (1939) 2nd Class (14 September 1939) & 1st Class (28 October 1939)
- Knight's Cross of the Iron Cross with Oak Leaves
  - Knight's Cross on 19 July 1940 as Oberleutnant and chief of the 9./Infanterie-Regiment 46
  - Oak Leaves on 11 February 1942 as Hauptmann and commander of the III./Infanterie-Regiment 46
- Wound Badge 20 July 1944

== Bibliography ==
- Fellgiebel, Walther-Peer (2000) [1986]. Die Träger des Ritterkreuzes des Eisernen Kreuzes 1939–1945 – Die Inhaber der höchsten Auszeichnung des Zweiten Weltkrieges aller Wehrmachtteile [The Bearers of the Knight's Cross of the Iron Cross 1939–1945 – The Owners of the Highest Award of the Second World War of all Wehrmacht Branches] (in German). Friedberg, Germany: Podzun-Pallas. ISBN 978-3-7909-0284-6.
- Hamilton, Charles (1984). Leaders & Personalities of the Third Reich. Vol. 1. R. James Bender Publishing. ISBN 0-912138-27-0.
- Scherzer, Veit (2007). Die Ritterkreuzträger 1939–1945 Die Inhaber des Ritterkreuzes des Eisernen Kreuzes 1939 von Heer, Luftwaffe, Kriegsmarine, Waffen-SS, Volkssturm sowie mit Deutschland verbündeter Streitkräfte nach den Unterlagen des Bundesarchives [The Knight's Cross Bearers 1939–1945 The Holders of the Knight's Cross of the Iron Cross 1939 by Army, Air Force, Navy, Waffen-SS, Volkssturm and Allied Forces with Germany According to the Documents of the Federal Archives] (in German). Jena, Germany: Scherzers Militaer-Verlag. ISBN 978-3-938845-17-2.
- Thomas, Franz (1997). Die Eichenlaubträger 1939–1945 Band 1: A–K [The Oak Leaves Bearers 1939–1945 Volume 1: A–K] (in German). Osnabrück, Germany: Biblio-Verlag. ISBN 978-3-7648-2299-6.
