= Shlomo Aronson (historian) =

Israeli historian (1936–2020)

Shlomo Aronson (Hebrew: שלמה אהרונסון; 13 October 1936 – 21 February 2020) was an Israeli historian and professor of political science at Hebrew University of Jerusalem.

== Biography ==
Shlomo Aronson was born in Tel Aviv. He worked as a newspaper columnist for Haaretz and Maariv, as well as a radio news editor. In 2007-2009 he was a visiting Professor in Israel Studies at The Arizona Center for Judaic Studies. Aronson died in Kfar Saba.

== Published works ==
Aronson's book Hitler, the Allies, and the Jews argued a thesis that he had advanced in many of his earlier publications—to "explain the Holocaust in terms of a multiple trap". According to Aronson, the Nazis devised this trap such that Jews' attempts to extricate themselves would only further the Nazis' genocidal ambitions. The book received mixed reviews.

The book received the Israeli Political Science Association Award for an outstanding book in English and the Sybil Milton Prize of the German Studies Association for outstanding work on the Holocaust.

- Aronson, Shlomo (2004). Hitler, the Allies, and the Jews. Cambridge: Cambridge University Press. ISBN 978-0-521-83877-1.
- David Ben-Gurion and the Jewish Renaissance (1999)
- ’’Levi Eshkol: From Pioneering Operator to Tragic Hero—-A Doer (Vallentine Mitchell, 2022)
