= Nicolaus von Below =

German Luftwaffe officer (1907–1983)

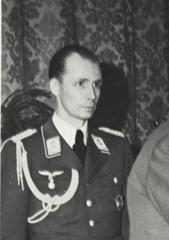
- Below in 1941
- Born: 20 September 1907; Anklam, Kingdom of Prussia, German Empire
- Died: 24 July 1983 (aged 75); Detmold, West Germany
- Military career
- Allegiance: Weimar Republic; Nazi Germany
- Branch: Reichswehr; Luftwaffe
- Service years: 1928–1945
- Rank: Oberst
- Conflicts: Second World War
- Awards: Pilot/Observer Badge in Gold with Diamonds; Wound Badge

Georg Ludwig Heinrich Nicolaus von Below (20 September 1907 – 24 July 1983) was an officer in the German Luftwaffe and an adjutant to Adolf Hitler.

== Early life ==
Below was born on the estate of Jargelin near Anklam in the Province of Pomerania. He was a member of the German aristocracy.

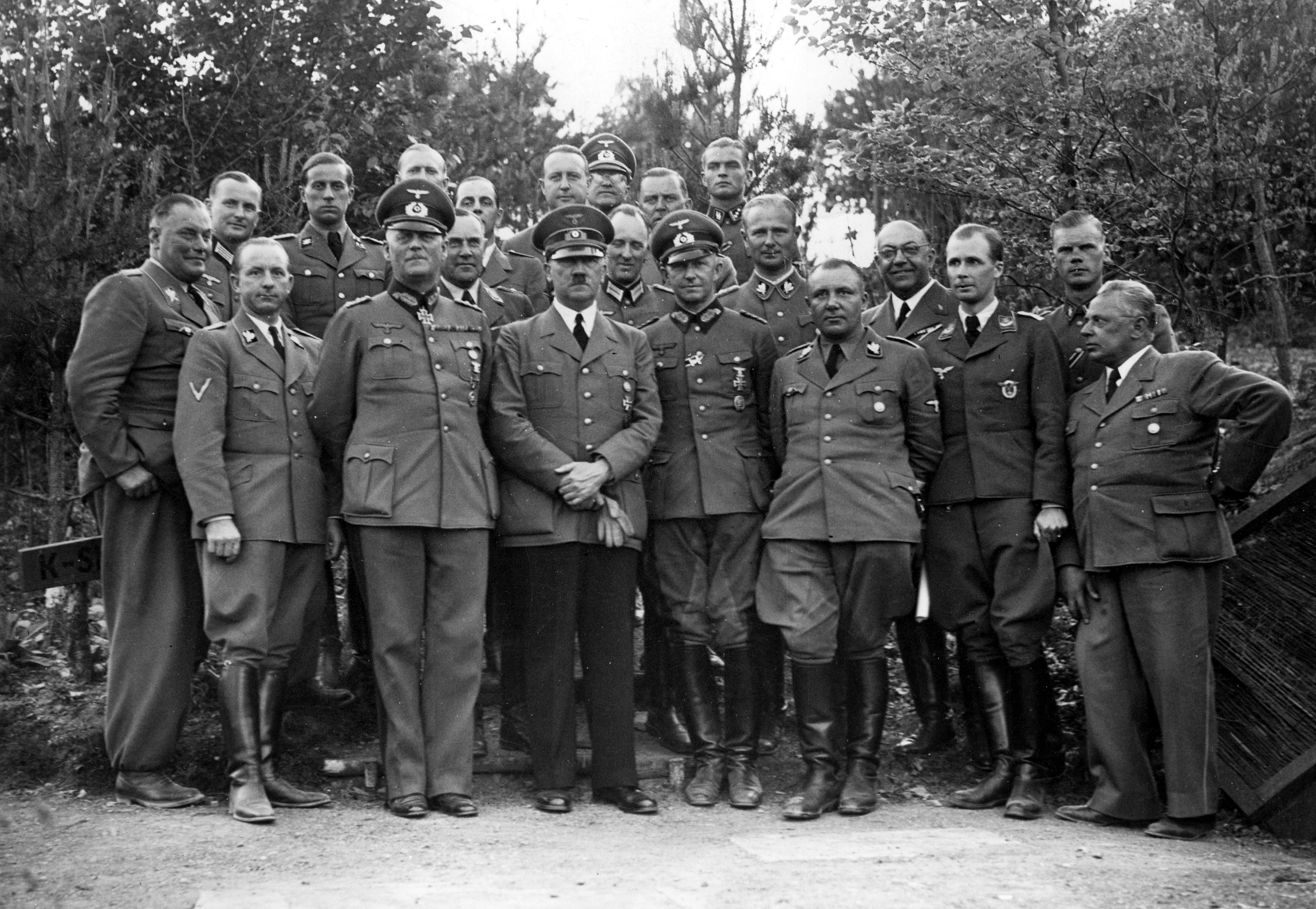
Nicolaus von Below (second from right, front row) with Hitler and staff in 1940

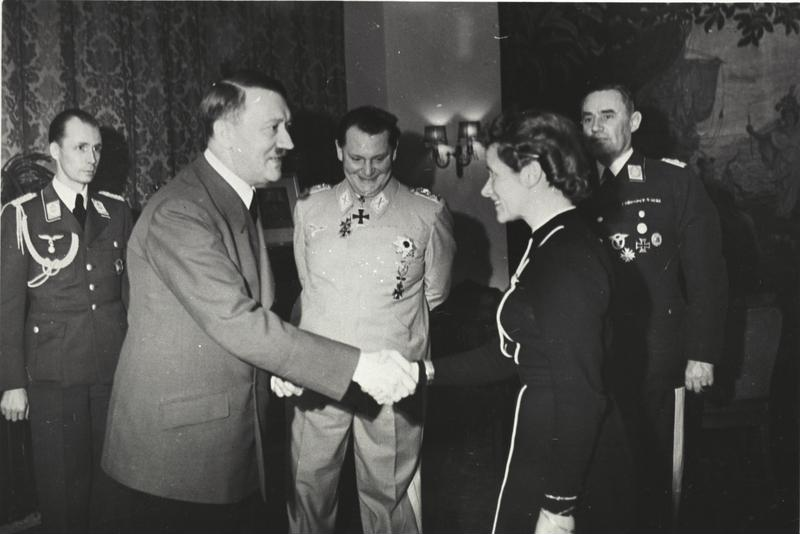
Nicolaus von Below (left) with Hitler, Hermann Göring and Hanna Reitsch in 1941

== Service ==
He trained as a pilot in 1929 at the Deutsche Verkehrsfliegerschule (DVS—German Air Transport School). From 1929 to 1933 he served with the Reichsheer 12th Infantry Regiment. Below then joined the German Air Force and served with Jagdgeschwader 132 "Richthofen" and then transferred to Jagdgeschwader 26. Below became German dictator Adolf Hitler's Air Force (Luftwaffe) military adjutant in 1937. Below's task was to be the link between Hitler and the air force leadership. Hitler generally disliked and was suspicious of soldiers with aristocratic backgrounds. This was particularly true as the tide of World War II turned against Germany. But Below, with the rank of colonel, was one of the few members of Hitler's entourage to continually serve in a close capacity for so many years.

During the time between the Christmas and New Year's holiday of 1944, Hitler told Below: "I know the war is lost, the enemy's superiority is far too great." But Hitler, still dwelling on the 20 July Plot to kill him, placed the blame on traitors. He then told Below: "We will never surrender, we may go down, but we will take a world with us."

=== Berlin 1945 ===
Hitler, presiding over a rapidly disintegrating Third Reich, retreated to his Führerbunker in Berlin on 16 January 1945. As his long serving Luftwaffe adjutant, Below traveled with Hitler back to Berlin. Early on, Hitler continued to utilize the undamaged wing of the Reich Chancellery, where he held afternoon military conferences in his large study. However, that practice ended and all the military briefing conferences were moved down into the Führerbunker. By April, to the German military leadership and some Nazi Party leaders, it was clear that the Battle for Berlin would be the final battle of the war. On 12 April 1945, Below was a guest of Albert Speer to see the last performance of the Berlin Philharmonic before the city was captured by the Red Army. He later wrote: "The concert took us back to another world."

On 15 April, Eva Braun was moved into the room next to the room Hitler occupied in the Führerbunker. Below wrote the following of her: "She was charming and obliging and showed no weakness right up to the last moment."

By 27 April, Below was part of a very small group which were present for the military briefings. General Krebs was the only senior military officer still present and Reich propaganda minister Joseph Goebbels, who had moved into the bunker complex with his family, now also was present. On 29 April, after the wedding of Hitler and Braun, Below was a witness to the last will and testament of Adolf Hitler. He did not sign the Political Testament but added his signature to the Private Testament of the document. Thereafter, Below asked Hitler if he could leave the Führerbunker and attempt to make it out of Berlin to the west. Hitler granted him permission to leave. On 30 April, Below left Berlin carrying a letter from Hitler to Field Marshal Wilhelm Keitel explaining the recent events of betrayal and extolling the sacrifices of the German people.

== Post-war ==
He was arrested by the British in 1946 and held until 1948. After the war, Below wrote a memoir of his experiences as an adjutant to Hitler from 1937 to 1945, Als Hitlers Adjutant 1937–45 (1980), translated as At Hitler's Side (2001) (ISBN 1-85367-468-0). He died on 24 July 1983 in Detmold, West Germany.
