= Heinz Lorenz =

German deputy press secretary (1913–1985)

Heinz Lorenz (7 August 1913 – 23 November 1985) was German Chancellor Adolf Hitler's Deputy Chief Press Secretary during World War II.

== Biography ==
A native of Schwerin, he studied law and economics at the university. He left school and in 1930 obtained a job as a press photographer for the German Telegraph office. In 1934 became a junior editor with the Deutsches Nachrichtenbüro DNB (German News Service). In 1936, he transferred to the Press Office and worked under Otto Dietrich, Press Chief of the Nazi Party. He became a reserve officer and served as Hauptschriftführer of the DNB from late 1942 onwards.

In 1945, Lorenz became the deputy press attaché in the Führerbunker. Towards the end of the war, after Germany's own communications system was all but lost, Lorenz monitored Reuters on the BBC. Lorenz became part of a group who fabricated news reports by reviewing and re-writing Allied news reports. Lorenz worked for General Hans Krebs, Bernd von Freytag-Loringhoven and Gerhard Boldt.

On 28 April 1945, Lorenz provided Hitler with confirmation that Heinrich Himmler had contacted and attempted peace negotiations with the western Allies through Count Folke Bernadotte.

During the pre-dawn hours of 29 April, Hitler ordered that three copies of his political testament be hand-delivered to Field Marshal Ferdinand Schörner in Czechoslovakia, Karl Dönitz in Schleswig-Holstein, and the Brown House, Munich by Hitler's army adjutant, Willy Johannmeyer, Martin Bormann's adjutant SS-Standartenführer Wilhelm Zander, and Lorenz, respectively. The three men said their farewell to Hitler and were handed a white dossier with the testament by Bormann at approximately 4.00 am. Armed with automatic weapons and wearing helmets to break through the Soviet lines, the couriers left the bunker around 8.00 am. The men made it through Potsdam and to the Elbe River.

== Post-war ==
Lorenz made it to the west. He was travelling under a false identity when arrested by the British in June 1945. Lorenz told interrogators who he really was and produced the original of Hitler's will and testament that he had kept hidden in the lining of his jacket. Lorenz was held in prison until mid-1947. Thereafter, Lorenz was private secretary to the Haus Hugo Stinnes from 1947 to 1953. He was parliamentary stenographer for the West German Bundestag from 1953 to 1958 and Leiter of the Stenographic Service of the Bundesrat from 1958 until retirement in 1978. Lorenz died in Düsseldorf on 23 November 1985 aged 72.

== See also ==
- Battle of Berlin
