= Christa Schroeder =

Secretary to Adolf Hitler (1908–1984)

- Schroeder, photographed at the Wolfsschanze
- Born: Emilie Christine Schroeder; 19 March 1908; Hannoversch Münden, Lower Saxony, German Empire
- Died: 28 June 1984 (aged 76); Munich, Bavaria, West Germany
- Occupations: Secretary; stenotypist; memoirist
- Employer: Adolf Hitler
- Known for: Being one of Adolf Hitler's personal secretaries before and during the Second World War

Emilie Christine Schroeder (19 March 1908 – 28 June 1984), also known as Christa Schroeder, was one of Adolf Hitler's personal secretaries before and during World War II.

== Early life ==
She was born in the small town of Hannoversch Münden and moved to Nagold after her parents died. There she worked for a lawyer from 1929 to March 1930.

== Working for Hitler ==
After leaving Nagold for Munich, Schroeder was employed as a shorthand-typist in the Oberste SA-Führung, the Sturmabteilung (SA) high command. There she got to know Adolf Hitler in early 1933, when he had just been appointed chancellor. He took a liking to Schroeder and hired her in June 1933.

Schroeder lived at Hitler's World War II Eastern Front military headquarters, known as the Wolfsschanze (Wolf's Lair) near Rastenburg, from 1941 until he and his staff departed for the last time on 20 November 1944. When Hitler withdrew his headquarters to the Führerbunker in Berlin in January 1945, she went with him and his staff. Before late April 1945 Hitler would regularly have lunch with Schroeder and fellow secretary Johanna Wolf.

On 20 April 1945, during the Battle of Berlin, Schroeder, Wolf, Albert Bormann, Admiral Karl-Jesko von Puttkamer, Dr Theodor Morell, Dr Hugo Blaschke, six shorthand-typists and several others were ordered by Hitler to leave Berlin by aircraft for the Obersalzberg. The group flew out of Berlin on different flights on aircraft of the Fliegerstaffel des Führers over the following three days. Her account of her service as Hitler's secretary (Er war mein Chef, Herbig, 2002) is an important source in the study of the Nazi years.

== Life after the war ==
She was arrested on 28 May 1945 in Hintersee near Berchtesgaden. Schroeder was interrogated by the French liaison officer Albert Zoller serving in the 7th US Army. She was released on 12 May 1948. The interrogation and later interviews in 1948 formed the basis for the first book published about Hitler after World War II in 1949, Hitler privat ("Hitler in private"). An English translation of Schroeder's book Er war mein Chef was published in 2009 under the title He Was My Chief: The Memoirs of Adolf Hitler's Secretary (Frontline Books, London). The book includes Anton Joachimsthaler's introduction from the original German edition and a new introduction by Roger Moorhouse. The book was serialised in The Sunday Telegraph magazine Seven, The Week magazine and the New York Post newspaper.

After the war Schroeder worked as a secretary for a construction company in Munich. Schroeder died on 28 June 1984 in Munich aged 76.

== See also ==
- Traudl Junge
- Gerda Christian
