= Johanna Wolf =

Secretary to Adolf Hitler

- Born: 1 June 1900; Munich, Kingdom of Bavaria, German Empire
- Died: 5 June 1985 (aged 85); Munich, Bavaria, West Germany
- Occupation: Secretary
- Employer: Adolf Hitler
- Known for: A private secretary of Adolf Hitler's before and during the Second World War

Johanna Wolf (1 June 1900 – 5 June 1985) was Adolf Hitler's chief secretary. Wolf joined Hitler's personal secretariat in the autumn of 1929 as a typist, at which time she also became a member of the Nazi Party. Wolf served as Hitler's chief secretary until the night of 21–22 April 1945, when she was ordered to fly out of Berlin to safety. She died on 5 June 1985.

== Biography ==
Wolf was born in Munich. She attended primary and commercial school. From 1922 through 1928, she worked for Dr. Alexander Glaser of the Bavarian Diet. She then worked for Gregor Strasser in the Nazi Party Gau headquarters of Lower Bavaria-Upper Palatinate. Wolf joined Hitler's personal secretariat in the autumn of 1929 as a typist, at which time she became a member of the Nazi Party. Prior to 1933, she also performed secretarial work for Rudolf Hess and Wilhelm Brückner, who at the time was Hitler's chief adjutant and a bodyguard.

When Hitler became chancellor in January 1933, she became a senior secretary in his Private Chancellery. Wolf, Hitler's senior secretary, was one of his oldest and longest tenured secretaries. While he addressed his other secretaries formally as "Frau" or "Fräulein", he called her "Wölfin" meaning She-Wolf because of his obsession with wolves. Wolf and Hitler had a close relationship. She was widely regarded as the most authoritative and comprehensive resource for information on Hitler. Wolf was a dedicated Nazi and a trusted member of Hitler's entourage. Wolf lived at the Wolfsschanze (Wolf's Lair) near Rastenburg, Adolf Hitler's World War II Eastern Front military headquarters from 1941 until he and his staff departed for the last time on 20 November 1944. When Hitler withdrew his headquarters to the Führerbunker in Berlin in January 1945, she went with him and his staff. The Führerbunker was located beneath the Reich Chancellery garden area in central Berlin. It became the epicentre of the Nazi regime until the end of April 1945. Before late April 1945, Hitler would regularly have lunch with Wolf and fellow secretary, Christa Schroeder.

On the night of 21–22 April 1945, Hitler, having decided to stay and die in Berlin, sent Wolf and Schroeder by aircraft of the Fliegerstaffel des Führers out of Berlin to Salzburg and then to his house at Berchtesgaden in Bavaria. A few days later down in the Führerbunker, Hitler married Eva Braun shortly before they committed suicide.

=== Capture ===
Wolf stayed at Berchtesgaden until 2 May and then traveled to her mother's residence in Bad Tölz. She was arrested and taken prisoner on 23 May in Bad Tölz by American troops. Together with Schroeder, she remained a prisoner until 14 January 1948. Wolf moved to Kaufbeuren afterwards and died in Munich on 5 June 1985 at the age of 85.

=== Loyalty to Hitler ===
Although Wolf served under Hitler for many years, unlike other secretaries such as Traudl Junge and Christa Schroeder, she refused to consent to any interviews or reveal any information, even during the 1970s when she was offered a large amount of money to write her memoirs. Whenever asked to do so, Wolf stated that she was a "private" secretary and believed it was her duty never to reveal anything about Hitler. When Wolf was taken prisoner, German filmmaker Leni Riefenstahl eventually got her to disclose some information about Hitler. Wolf said people close to Hitler were not able to escape his magnetism until his death, even though he was quite emaciated. She was so loyal to Hitler that she wanted to die with him in the Führerbunker, but departed because Hitler urged her to leave for the sake of her 80-year-old mother. He forced her and others to leave on the last flights out of Berlin. She claimed that Hitler was not aware of all the terrible things that were happening in Germany during his reign, that fanatics exerted more and more influence on him, and that they gave orders Hitler knew nothing about.

== See also ==
- Gerda Christian
