= Hans Baur =

German military aviator (1897–1993)

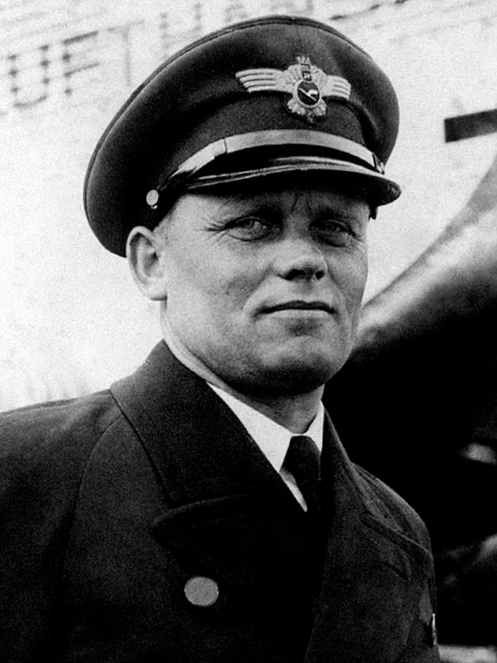
- Baur, c. 1930
- Born: 19 June 1897; Ampfing, Kingdom of Bavaria, German Empire
- Died: 17 February 1993 (aged 95); Herrsching, Bavaria, Germany
- Military career
- Allegiance: German Empire; Nazi Germany
- Service years: 1915–1918; 1933–1945
- Rank: SS-Gruppenführer and Generalleutnant of the Police
- Unit: Die Fliegerstaffel des Führers
- Commands: Government squadron
- Conflicts: World War I World War II
- Awards: Iron Cross First Class

Johannes 'Hans' Baur (19 June 1897 – 17 February 1993) was Adolf Hitler's pilot during the political campaigns of the early 1930s. He began his aviation career as a flying ace in World War I. He later became Hitler's personal pilot and leader of the Reichsregierung squadron. Apprehended by the Soviet Union at the end of World War II in Europe, he was imprisoned in the Soviet Union for ten years. He died in Herrsching, Bavaria, in February 1993.

== World War I and interwar period ==
Baur was born in Ampfing, Kingdom of Bavaria. He was called up to the Bavarian Army in 1915, and trained in field artillery. He then joined the Luftstreitkräfte (air force) as an artillery spotter. In 1918, Baur served in FA 295 as an Unteroffizier pilot of two-seater Hannover CL.III ground attack aircraft. His observer was Leutnant Georg Ritter von Hengl. Baur was credited with six confirmed and three unconfirmed victories against French aircraft beginning 17 July 1918. Vizefeldwebel Baur was awarded the Iron Cross First Class and the Bavarian Silver Bravery Medal for attacking a French formation of seven and downing two of the SPADs that day. Baur would score his last victories on 29 October 1918.

After the war, he joined the Freikorps under Franz von Epp. He went on to become a courier flier for the Bavarian airmail service. Beginning in 1922, he was a pilot for Bayrische Luftlloyd, and then Junkers. In 1926, Baur became a pilot of Deutsche Luft Hansa. In the same year, he also became a member of the Nazi Party (No. 48,113). On 1 April 1931, he flew the opening flight of the Berlin-Munich-Rome route, known as the Alpine flight, whose passengers included Nuntius Eugenio Pacelli, Arturo Toscanini and Tsar Boris III of Bulgaria.

== Hitler's personal pilot ==
Hitler was the first politician to campaign by air travel, deciding that travel by plane was more efficient than travel by railway. Baur first served as his pilot during the 1932 General Election.

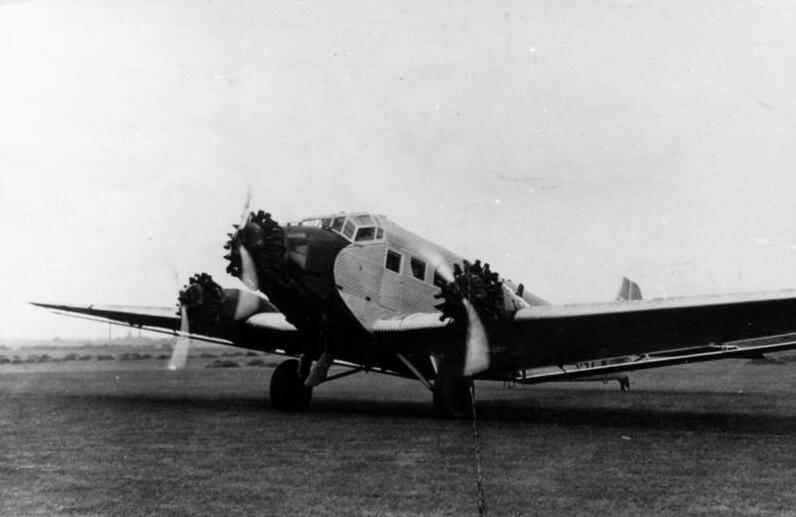
Adolf Hitler's personal Ju 52

Hitler obtained his first private aeroplane, a Junkers Ju 52/3m with registration number D-2600 (Werk Nr. 4021), in 1933, after becoming German Chancellor. The same registration number continued to be used for all aircraft used by Hitler, even during the war years. The Ju 52 was named Immelmann II after the First World War pilot Max Immelmann. Baur was personally selected by Hitler to be his official pilot in 1933 and was consequently released from service by Luft Hansa.

=== Fliegerstaffel des Führers ===
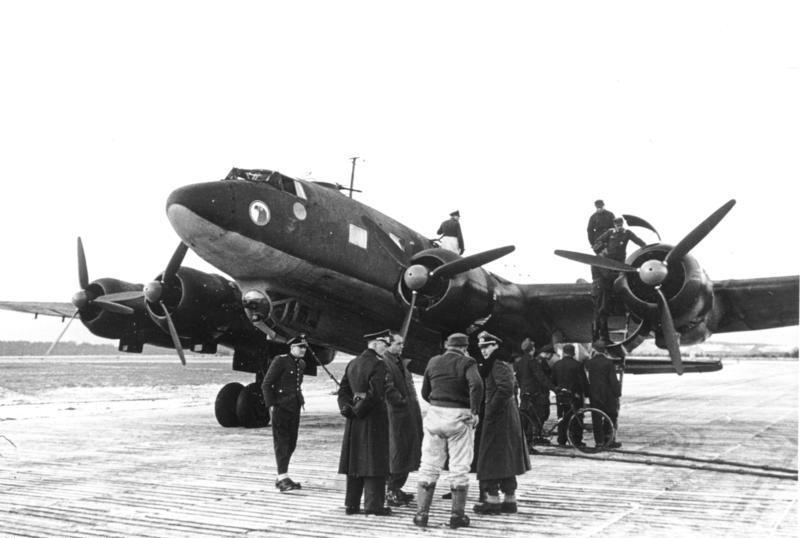
Hitler's personal Fw 200 Condor

Baur was appointed head of Hitler's personal squadron, initially based at Oberwiesenfeld, Munich. As the Luftwaffe was not yet officially established, Hitler wanted Baur to be able to command sufficient power and respect to assure his security, therefore, Baur was commissioned a Standartenführer (colonel) in the Schutzstaffel (SS No. 171,865) by Heinrich Himmler in October, 1933.

Baur was given the task of expanding and organising Hitler's personal squadron and the government "flying group". In 1934, Baur was promoted to the rank of SS-Oberführer. Hitler allowed Baur to fill his squadron with experienced Luft Hansa pilots, including Georg Betz who became co-pilot for Hitler's aircraft and Hans Baur's substitute. By 1937, Hitler had three Ju 52 airplanes for flight use. Then in 1937, Hitler obtained a new aircraft, the Focke-Wulf Fw 200 Condor which was named, "Immelmann III". The Condor had a much greater range and was faster than the Ju 52. In 1942, an improved model of the Condor was put into use for Hitler's travels and Baur continued to be his primary pilot. A Ju 290 was assigned to Hitler's renamed squadron, Fliegerstaffel des Führers (FdF) in late 1944. Modifications were completed by February 1945 at the FdF's base at Pocking, Bavaria. Baur tested the aircraft, but Hitler never flew in it. Still by the end of the war, Baur commanded a total of 40 different aircraft, including Ju 52, Condors, Ju 290 and the little Fieseler Fi 156 Storch.

Although he tried to convert Baur to vegetarianism, Hitler also invited him to the Reich Chancellery for his favourite meal of pork and dumplings for his 40th birthday, and gave him a Mercedes-Benz to replace his personal Ford.

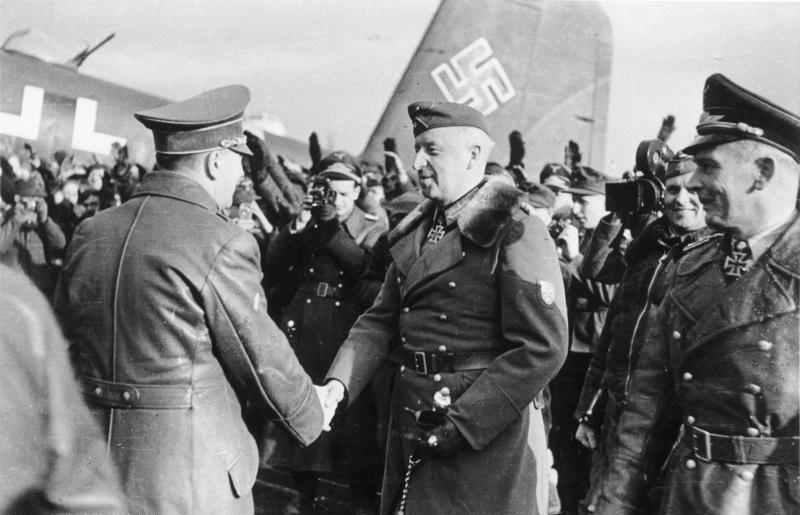
On 10 March 1943, Hitler flew in to Army Group South's HQ at Zaporizhzhia, Ukraine. Erich von Manstein is greeting Hitler; on the right are Wolfram von Richthofen and Baur.

== Führerbunker and imprisonment ==
On 31 January 1944, Baur was promoted to SS-Brigadeführer (brigadier general) and major general of the police; and on 24 February 1945, he became an SS-Gruppenführer (major general) and Generalleutnant of the Police.

During the last days of the war, Baur was with Hitler in the Führerbunker. Baur had devised a plan to allow Hitler to escape from the Battle of Berlin; a Fieseler Fi 156 Storch was held on standby which could take off from an improvised airstrip in the Tiergarten, near the Brandenburg Gate. However, Hitler refused to leave Berlin. On 26 April 1945, the improvised landing strip was used by Hanna Reitsch to fly in then-Generaloberst Robert Ritter von Greim, appointed by Hitler as head of the Luftwaffe after Hermann Göring's dismissal; the pair left using the same airstrip a couple of nights later.

On 29 April 1945, the Soviet Red Army launched an all-out attack on the centre of Berlin. The Soviet artillery opened up with intense fire in and around the Reich Chancellery area. That evening in the bunker complex below the Chancellery garden, Hitler said his farewell to his personal pilots, Baur and Betz. Baur pleaded with Hitler to leave Berlin. The men volunteered to fly Hitler out of Germany in a Ju 390 and to safety. Hitler turned Baur down, stating that he had to stay in Berlin. Hitler gave Baur one of his prized possessions, a portrait of Frederick the Great.

Baur stayed in the bunker complex until Hitler killed himself on the afternoon of 30 April. After Hitler's suicide, Baur found the improvised airstrip too potholed for use and overrun by the Soviet 3rd Shock Army. A plan was devised to escape from Berlin to the Allies on the western side of the Elbe or to the German Army to the north. SS-Brigadeführer Wilhelm Mohnke split up the Reich Chancellery and Führerbunker soldiers and personnel into ten main groups. Baur, Betz and Martin Bormann left the Reich Chancellery as part of one of the groups. Baur became separated from them and then joined another group trying to get to Lehrter station. Thereafter, he was shot in the legs; the wound was so serious that his right lower leg was later amputated in Poznań on 10 June 1945, while a Soviet prisoner-of-war.

Baur was taken to the Soviet Union, where he was subjected to interrogational torture. Baur was of great interest to his Soviet captors, who believed he might have helped Hitler escape before the fall of Berlin. Soviet interrogators accused him of flying the dictator to safety in Francoist Spain, which Baur disavowed. He also confirmed to journalist James P. O'Donnell no long range transport plane was present at that time in Berlin, which could have taken Hitler away. They also believed he had information concerning stolen art, specifically about the plundering of the Amber Room (Bernsteinzimmer) in Leningrad. He told the Soviets that he never saw Hitler's corpse and only learned of the details from other Nazis during his detainment. During his confinement, Baur told fellow inmates (and former SS officers) Heinz Linge and Otto Günsche to "Never say what really happened" during the last days in the bunker, remaining loyal to Hitler.

== Book and later life ==
After ten years of imprisonment, Baur was released from Soviet custody on 10 October 1955.

Remaining in West Germany, in 1957 Baur wrote his autobiography Ich flog die Mächtigen der Erde (literally "I flew the mighty of the Earth"). Later, a lengthened version was published as Mit Mächtigen zwischen Himmel und Erde ("Between Heaven and Earth with the Mighty"). The French translation is titled J'étais pilote de Hitler: Le sort du monde était entre mes mains ("I was Hitler's pilot: The fate of the world was in my hands"). The book was released in English with the title I Was Hitler's Pilot.

The book is a collection of Baur's eyewitness accounts of Hitler's daily activities and conversations. Baur, as Hitler's private pilot and personal friend, was in his presence most days from 1933 to 1945. The book also includes an account of the events surrounding Hitler's arrest of Ernst Röhm on 30 June 1934 at Bad Wiessee, in which Baur took part. The book tells of Baur's dislike for Göring (whom Baur describes as a "thick-headed glutton"). Baur was one of the few people who was close to Hitler and was one of the last people to see him alive in the Führerbunker.

Baur died in Germany on 17 February 1993.

== Personal life ==
Hans Baur married Elfriede Baur in 1923. Their only daughter, Ingeborg, was born the following year. After Elfriede Baur's death from cancer in 1935, Baur married again, with Hitler as his best man. His second wife, Maria, by whom he had two daughters, died while he was in captivity in the Soviet Union. His third wife, Cresentia, survived him.

== Decorations and awards ==
- 1914 Iron Cross 2nd Class
- 1914 Iron Cross 1st Class
- Military Merit Cross (Bavaria) 3rd Class with Crown and Swords
- Ehrenbecher für den Sieger im Luftkampf wiki Germany
- Bavarian Military Merit Medal in Silver, July 1918
- Pilot/Observer Badge
- SA Sports Badge in Bronze, 1 December 1937
- Degen (SS), 1 December 1937
- Anschluss Medal
- Sudetenland Medal
- Danzig Cross 2nd Class, 24 October 1939
- Golden Party Badge
- SS Ehrendolch
- Honour Chevron for the Old Guard
- Order of the Crown (Romania), April 1942
- Order of the Crown of King Zvonimir, 1943

== See also ==
- List of SS-Gruppenführer

== Bibliography ==
- Baur, Hans (2013) [1956]. I Was Hitler's Pilot: The Memoirs of Hans Baur. Barnsley: Frontline Books. ISBN 978-1-84832-696-5.
- Brisard, Jean-Christophe; Parshina, Lana (2018). The Death of Hitler. Da Capo Press. ISBN 978-0306922589.
- de Boer, Sjoerd (2021). Escaping Hitler's Bunker: The Fate of the Third Reich Leaders. Frontline Books. ISBN 978-1-52679-269-3.
- Eberle, Henrik; Uhl, Matthias, eds. (2005). The Hitler Book: The Secret Dossier Prepared for Stalin from the Interrogations of Hitler's Personal Aides. Translated by Giles MacDonogh. New York: Public Affairs. ISBN 978-1-58648-366-1.
- Fest, Joachim (2004). Inside Hitler's Bunker: The Last Days of the Third Reich. New York: Farrar, Straus and Giroux. ISBN 978-0-374-13577-5.
- Fischer, Thomas (2008). Soldiers of the Leibstandarte: SS-Brigadefuhrer Wilhelm Mohnke and 62 Soldiers of Hitler's Elite Division. Winnipeg: J.J. Fedorowicz. ISBN 978-0-921991-91-5.
- Hoffmann, Peter (2000). Hitler's Personal Security: Protecting the Führer 1921–1945. Da Capo Press. ISBN 978-0-30680-947-7.
- Joachimsthaler, Anton (1999) [1995]. The Last Days of Hitler: The Legends, the Evidence, the Truth. Trans. Helmut Bögler. London: Brockhampton Press. ISBN 978-1-86019-902-8.
- Kershaw, Ian (2008). Hitler: A Biography. New York: W. W. Norton & Company. ISBN 978-0-393-06757-6.
- Miller, Michael (2006). Leaders of the SS and German Police, Vol. 1. San Jose, CA: R. James Bender. ISBN 978-93-297-0037-2.
- O'Donnell, James P. (1978). The Bunker: The History of the Reich Chancellery Group. Boston: Houghton Mifflin. ISBN 978-0-395-25719-7.
- O'Donnell, James P. (2001) [1978]. The Bunker: The History of the Reich Chancellery Group. New York: Da Capo Press. ISBN 978-0-306-80958-3.
- Sweeting, C. G.; Boyne, Walter J. (2001). Hitler's Squadron: The Fuehrer's Personal Aircraft and Transport Unit, 1933–45. Washington, D.C.: Brassey's. ISBN 1-57488-469-7.
- Above the Lines: The Aces and Fighter Units of the German Air Service, Naval Air Service and Flanders Marine Corps, 1914–1918. Norman Franks, Frank W. Bailey, Russell Guest. Grub Street, 1993. ISBN 0-948817-73-9, ISBN 978-0-948817-73-1.
