= Adolf Hitler's bodyguard =

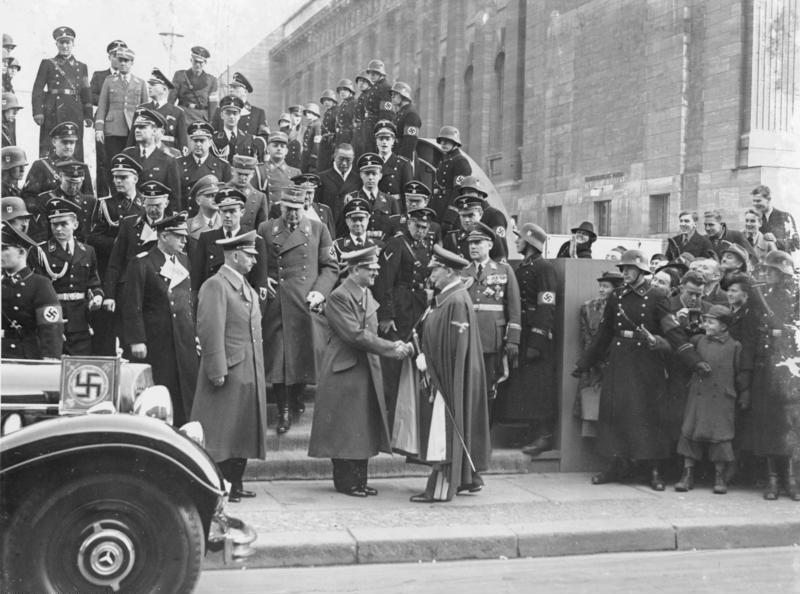
Führerbegleitkommando and other uniformed SS men providing security for Hitler in February 1939

Adolf Hitler was dictator of Germany from 1933 to 1945, the initiator of World War II in Europe and central to the Holocaust. Over the years, he had numerous bodyguard units that provided security. Some 40 known schemes were made to assassinate him by ideological opponents, wartime enemies and Germans who wanted to save Germany from destruction. A very few of those reached the state of execution, but none were successful.

When Hitler returned to Munich from military service in 1918, he became a member of the Nazi Party, an extremist far-right political party in Bavaria. In 1921, he was elected leader of the party. As his speeches promoted violence and racism, Hitler needed permanent security.

Founded in 1920, the Sturmabteilung (SA) was the first of many paramilitary protection squads that worked to protect Nazi officials. In 1923, a small bodyguard unit, which became known as the Stosstrupp-Hitler, was set up specifically for Hitler's protection. It was under the control of the SA. Then in 1925, as the Nazi Party grew, the Schutzstaffel (SS) was created as a sub-section of the SA. Initially only about a hundred men, it was also originally a personal protection unit for Hitler. Several other bodyguard organisations, such as the Führerbegleitkommando (FBK), Leibstandarte SS Adolf Hitler (LSSAH), and Reichssicherheitsdienst (RSD) were created as sub-sections of the SS. Police and security forces available included the Geheime Staatspolizei (Gestapo), Ordnungspolizei (Orpo), Kriminalpolizei (Kripo), and Sicherheitspolizei (SiPo). In addition, the Nazi intelligence organisation, the Sicherheitsdienst (SD), investigated and performed security checks on people, including party members. If the SD personnel determined an arrest was to be made, they passed the information on to the Gestapo. Like many autocratic rulers, Hitler surrounded himself with security units for protection.

== Background ==
In 1918, Adolf Hitler returned to Munich after Germany's defeat in World War I. Similar to many German veterans at the time, he was left feeling bitter and frustrated. He believed in the widely held "Stab-in-the-back myth", that the German Army did not lose the war on the battlefield but on the home front due to the communists and Jews.

The 1930s were a time of civil unrest in Germany, compounded by the economic problems of the Great Depression. In this environment, a number of extremist political parties took form, including the German Workers' Party (DAP), a short-lived predecessor of the Nazi Party. Sensing an opportunity, Hitler decided to join the DAP, which was renamed the Nazi Party in 1920. He was considered a charismatic orator which led to him being chosen to lead the party the following year. Over the years, the number of Hitler's enemies expanded, especially after the Nazi Party's seizure of power in 1933. Security problems increased as Germany began its annexation of territory, "occupation" of countries and with the invasion of Poland, which initiated World War II in Europe. His bodyguard commanders thereby established a security structure that was followed throughout the war in Europe.

== Bodyguard organisations ==
- Sturmabteilung ("Storm Detachment"; SA) was a paramilitary organisation of the Nazi Party created in 1920 to police party rallies and disrupt their opponents' meetings. By the time the Nazis seized power in 1933, it had grown to almost four million men. It was commanded by Ernst Röhm, who was shot in 1934 on Hitler's orders after refusing to commit suicide.
- Stosstrupp-Hitler ("Shock Troop-Hitler"; SSH) was a separate small bodyguard unit formed on Hitler's order in 1923. It was dedicated to his service rather than "a suspect mass" of the party, such as the SA. Members included Rudolf Hess, who was later the dictator's deputy; Julius Schreck, who later became Hitler's personal chauffeur; and Emil Maurice, who was imprisoned with Hitler after the failed Beer Hall Putsch in 1923. Others included Ulrich Graf, an early party member who was nearly killed during the 1923 putsch, and Bruno Gesche, a tough street fighter. On 9 November 1923, the Stosstrupp, along with the SA and several other Nazi paramilitary units, took part in the abortive putsch in Munich. In the aftermath, Hitler was imprisoned and his party and all associated formations, including the Stosstrupp, were disbanded.
- Schutzstaffel ("Protection Squadron"; SS) was a personal protection squad for Hitler created in 1925. Whereas the SA numbered in the millions, the SS started with less than a hundred men. The SS uniform included a black tie and a black cap with a Totenkopf ("death's head") skull and bones symbol on it. After March 1927, the SS had stricter entry requirements than the general SA. Although subordinate to the SA until the summer of 1934, its members behaved as though they were the Nazi Party elite. From January 1929 forward, the SS was commanded by Heinrich Himmler in his capacity as Reichsführer-SS; later in 1936, Himmler was appointed chief of all German police. Within the SS main branches of the Allgemeine SS, SS-Totenkopfverbände, and Waffen-SS, there further existed sub-branches, including the Reich Security Main Office or RSHA (its departments included: the SD, Gestapo, and the Kripo). After the war, pursuant to the judgments rendered at the Nuremberg trials, as well as many war crimes investigations and trials conducted since then, the SS was judged to be a criminal organisation and determined to be responsible for the majority of Nazi war crimes. In particular, it was the primary organisation which carried out the Holocaust.
- Sicherheitsdienst ("Security Service"; SD) was a security and intelligence service of the SS and later of the Nazi Party as a whole. The SD was founded by Himmler in 1931 as the Ic-Dienst. It was headed by Reinhard Heydrich. In 1932, the organisation was renamed the Sicherheitsdienst, and by April 1934 it was considered a sister organisation of the Gestapo. The SD was mainly the information-gathering agency, and the Gestapo, and to a degree the Kriminalpolizei (Kripo), was the executive agency of the political police system. Under Heydrich's control, the SD and the Gestapo answered to Himmler as Chief of the German Police and Reichsfuhrer-SS. By 1944, the SD had more than 6,000 members. After Heydrich's death, the agency was led by Ernst Kaltenbrunner.
- SS-Begleitkommando des Führers ("Escort Command of the Führer"; SS-BKdF) was an SS protection unit formed in February 1932 as Hitler's protection escort while travelling. The unit consisted of eight men who served around the clock protecting Hitler. Later the SS-Begleitkommando was expanded and became known as the Führerbegleitkommando ("Führer Escort Command"; FBK). It continued under separate command and remained responsible for Hitler's personal protection. SS–Obersturmbannführer Franz Schädle was appointed the last FBK commander on 5 January 1945, after the dismissal of Bruno Gesche.
- Führer Schutzkommando ("Führer Protection Command"; FSK) was a protection unit founded by Himmler in March 1933. Originally charged with protecting the Führer only while he was inside the borders of Bavaria, its members consisted of police detectives of the Bavarian police and ministry. In the spring of 1934, they replaced the SS-Begleitkommando for Hitler's overall protection throughout Germany. The FSK was renamed the Reichssicherheitsdienst ("Reich Security Service"; RSD) in August 1935. Thereafter, the RSD and FBK worked together for security and protection during trips and public events, but they operated as two groups and used separate vehicles. Johann Rattenhuber, chief of the RSD, was in overall command and the FBK chief acted as his deputy.
- Leibstandarte SS Adolf Hitler ("Life Guards SS Adolf Hitler"; LSSAH) was an elite SS protection unit founded in 1933 as a palace guard to provide protection for Hitler's residences and offices. The LSSAH had some of the strictest entry requirements. The commander, Sepp Dietrich insisted that the men be in good physical condition, between the ages of 23 and 35, and have a confirmed ancestry record without Jewish lineage. The LSSAH eventually grew into an elite division of the Waffen-SS. Although nominally under Himmler, Dietrich was the real commander and handled day-to-day administration. By 1945, while the LSSAH fought on the Eastern Front during World War II, a core group of 800 men stayed in Berlin and made up the Leibstandarte Guard Battalion (Wache Reichskanzlei), assigned to guard the Führer.
- Geheime Staatspolizei ("Secret State Police"; Gestapo) was the secret police force of Nazi Germany and German-occupied Europe. Formed in April 1933 by aviation minister Hermann Göring, it was by the following year administrated by the SS and regarded as a sister organisation of the SD. The Gestapo relied on members of other agencies, spies, and a huge network of informants for information. It was led by Heydrich and Heinrich Müller. Whether trained as police originally or not, Gestapo agents themselves were shaped by their socio-political environment. Historian George C. Browder contends that there was a four-part process (authorisation, bolstering, routinisation, and dehumanisation) in effect which legitimised the psycho-social atmosphere conditioning members of the Gestapo to radicalised violence. The power of the Gestapo included what was called, Schutzhaft ("protective custody"), a euphemism for the power to arrest and imprison people without judicial proceedings.
- Ordnungspolizei ("Order Police"; Orpo) was the uniformed police force in Nazi Germany. Created in 1936 by the interior ministry, it was responsible for law enforcement throughout Germany. It was originally under the command of police general Kurt Daluege, but after he suffered a heart attack in 1943, he was replaced by Alfred Wünnenberg. By 1944, the organisation had more than 400,000 members, making it the largest police force in Germany.
- Kriminalpolizei ("Criminal Police"; Kripo) were the criminal police of Nazi Germany. The agency's employees were mostly plainclothes detectives and agents, and worked in conjunction with the Gestapo. It was under the command of Arthur Nebe of the Reichskriminalpolizeiamt (which later became Amt V of the RSHA) until 1944. In the last year of its existence, Amt V was commanded by Friedrich Panzinger, who answered to Kaltenbrunner.
- Sicherheitspolizei ("Security Police"; SiPo) was the criminal investigation security agency of Nazi Germany. Created in 1936, it was composed of the Gestapo and the Kripo. In September 1939, the agency was folded into the Reichssicherheitshauptamt ("Reich Security Main Office"; RSHA).
- Führer Begleitbattalion ("Führer Escort Battalion"; FBB) was a military protection unit set up just before war began. It had the task of protecting Hitler's military headquarters and accompanying him when visiting battlefronts. It also was responsible for all luggage that travelled with Hitler and his staff. It was originally commanded by Erwin Rommel. Otto Ernst Remer went on to command an expanded FBB, which played a key role in putting down the attempted military coup against Hitler on 20 July 1944 in Berlin.

== Reichssicherheitsdienst incident ==
In 1932–33, the RSD was only allowed to provide security duties for Hitler at a distance. One evening in 1933, while traveling in Munich, Hitler became aware of an unknown car following his own. He told his driver Erich Kempka to accelerate the supercharged Mercedes-Benz, so the following car could not keep up. It turned out that the car pursuing Hitler was full of RSD bodyguards, who had not thought to inform the Führer or any of his immediate entourage beforehand. This incident illustrates the "sometimes farcical nature of Hitler's security" during the early years. It further is an example of the duplication of departments and units with overlapping responsibilities, which was common in Nazi Germany. This policy was used in the "hierarchy" of the SS and Nazi Party to prevent one person or one group from accumulating too much power.

== Protection structure ==
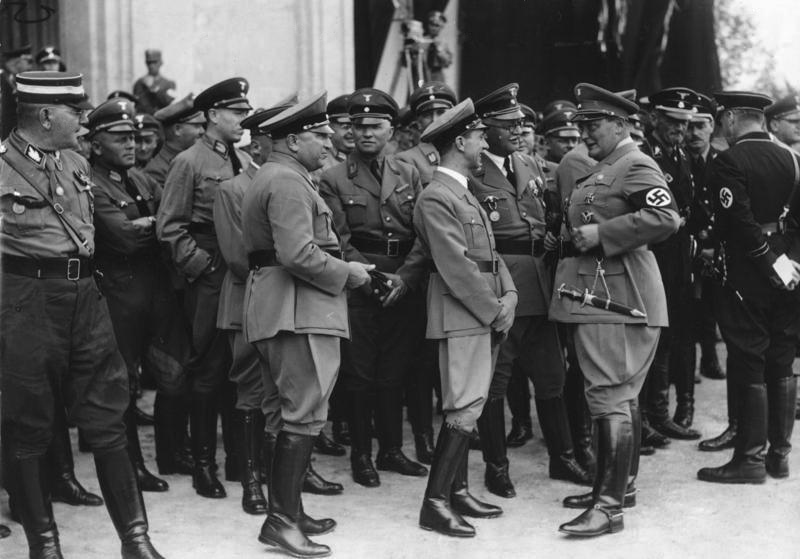
RSD bodyguards mingling during the arrival of Joseph Goebbels and Hermann Göring, 1936

As Hitler went from being a stateless street politician to supreme leader of Nazi Germany, the responsibilities of his bodyguard expanded enormously. The bodyguard leaders in the Führer's inner circle eventually established a routine and by 1939 the roles were more clearly defined as to what duties each unit would undertake.

Everywhere Hitler went, he was accompanied by men of the FBK. They worked in three shifts, providing close protection of Hitler. Before a trip or important public event, the RSD checked the route, the buildings along it, and the places which Hitler was to visit. The local Gestapo office provided intelligence reports, along with information as to any assassination rumours, to the RSD. Orpo police officers were called in as necessary to help with security. As far as possible, the streets or approaches to a building were lined with uniformed SS men, with every third man facing the crowd. At the same time, plainclothes SS men or Kripo police officers mingled with the crowd of spectators. Hitler's motorcade was preceded by a pilot car. Hitler's car, usually an open Mercedes-Benz, followed 50 metres behind. Hitler always stood or sat in the front seat, beside the driver, with a FBK member and an adjutant behind him. Following his car were two cars to the left and right, one with the rest of the FBK and the other with a detachment of RSD men. Then came the car of other Nazi chieftains and/or SS leaders; after a further 100-metre gap came the car or cars with any additional guests.

The LSSAH guarded Hitler's private residences and offices, providing an outer ring of protection for the Führer and his visitors. Buildings protected included the old Reich Chancellery, the new Reich Chancellery, and the Berghof in the Obersalzberg of the Bavarian Alps near Berchtesgaden, Bavaria. LSSAH men manned sentry posts at the entrances to the old Reich Chancellery and the new Reich Chancellery. The Orpo police also had sentry posts inside, where people's passes and identity cards were checked. The RSD were responsible for having the Gestapo and Kripo run security checks on any employees and workers. They were assisted by the SD, which investigated and monitored people for subversive activities and passed the information gathered on to the Gestapo for action when needed. Wherever Hitler was in residence, members of the RSD and FBK would be present. The RSD men patrolled the grounds and the FBK men provided close security protection. For special events, the number of LSSAH guards were increased. At the Berghof residence in the Obersalzberg, a large contingent of the LSSAH were housed in adjacent barracks. They patrolled an extensive cordoned security zone that encompassed the nearby homes of other Nazi leaders. Further, the nearby former hotel "Turken" was turned into quarters to house the RSD. The FBK men were always with Hitler, providing the close security protection.

After the war started, the FBB provided wider security protection for Hitler when in residence at the Berghof, as he travelled by vehicle to front-line command posts and at military headquarters. They would be in heavily armed vehicles at the front and back of Hitler's convoy. In addition, army motorcycle outriders were positioned at the front and rear of the convoy of vehicles. The FBK would ride with Hitler and the RSD men would ride in a separate car during the trips.

== Security breaches ==
=== Bürgerbräukeller beer hall ===
On 8 November 1939, Hitler went to the Bürgerbräukeller beer hall in Munich for the annual anniversary celebration of the attempted putsch of 1923. He began speaking around 8:10 pm, earlier than usual because he had urgent business in Berlin. He left the hall at around 9:07 pm. About thirteen minutes later, a time bomb which had been concealed inside a pillar behind the speaker's rostrum exploded, killing eight and injuring sixty-three.

The man behind the elaborate assassination attempt was Johann Georg Elser, a carpenter-cabinet maker from Baden-Württemberg who had supported the Kommunistische Partei Deutschlands (German Communist Party; KPD), but also felt Hitler was leading the country to war. After the beer hall closed, from August until the beginning of November, he worked carving out a concealed cavity in a section in a pillar. By the time the bomb exploded, Elser was heading to the Swiss border. He was apprehended by German customs police and handed over for interrogation by the Gestapo before being sent to Dachau concentration camp. He was executed on 9 April 1945. The event was an embarrassment for the security services and given the "sensitivity of the case" Himmler and Heydrich took personal charge of the investigation. Although Elser had acted alone without any help, Heydrich was convinced the British Secret Service was involved.

=== Smolensk front-line visit ===
On 13 March 1943, in preparation for the Battle of Kursk, Hitler visited the Eastern Front at Smolensk. Originally the plan was for certain officers to shoot Hitler collectively at a signal given in the officers' mess during lunch. However, that plan was cast aside. Instead a second plan devised by General Henning von Tresckow's anti-Nazi resistance group was carried out. Upon leaving, staff officer Heinz Brandt, who was traveling in Hitler's entourage, agreed to take a box containing two bottles of cognac to Colonel Hellmuth Stieff who was stationed at Hitler's headquarters. The package was given to Brandt by Tresckow. The cognac bottles were actually a bomb placed into a casing, with a timer fuse. The plane took off with both Hitler and Brandt on board, but it arrived safely at the Wolf's Lair field headquarters in East Prussia. The bomb most likely failed to detonate because the extremely low temperatures in the unheated luggage compartment of the plane prevented the fuse from operating properly.

=== Wolf's Lair military conference ===
Hitler's most famous military headquarters during the war was the Wolf's Lair (Wolfsschanze). He spent more time at that Eastern Front military field headquarters than any other. Hitler first arrived at the headquarters in June 1941. In total, he spent more than 800 days there during a 3 1/2-year period until his final departure on 20 November 1944. It was guarded by personnel from the RSD and FBB.

It had several security zones. Sperrkreis 1 (Security Zone 1) was located at the heart of the Wolf's Lair. Ringed by steel fencing and guarded by RSD and FBK men, it contained Hitler's bunker and ten other camouflaged bunkers built from 2 metres (6 ft 7 in) thick steel-reinforced concrete. Sperrkreis 2 (Security Zone 2) surrounded the inner zone. This area housed the quarters of several Reich ministers, the HQ personnel, two messes, a communication centre, as well as the military barracks for the FBB. Sperrkreis 3 (Security Zone 3) was a heavily fortified outer security area which surrounded the two inner zones. It was defended by land mines and FBB personnel, which manned guard houses, watchtowers, and checkpoints. Despite the security, the most notable assassination attempt against Hitler was made at the Wolf's Lair on 20 July 1944.

With Germany suffering major defeat on all fronts, Claus von Stauffenberg and his ring of conspirators decided to eliminate Hitler and the Nazi leadership, establish a new government, and save the country from total destruction. On 20 July 1944, during a military conference at the Wolf's Lair, Stauffenberg planted a briefcase bomb underneath Hitler's conference table and then quickly left, claiming he had to make an important telephone call. Shortly after, the bomb exploded, fatally wounding three officers and the stenographer, who died shortly thereafter. Hitler survived with only minor injuries, as did everyone else who was shielded from the blast by the conference table leg.

The FBB closed all three Security Zone checkpoints, but by then Stauffenberg's car had been let through two of them as he left the area. Contrary to the imposed security doctrine in place, Stauffenberg and his adjutant were able to pass through the closed Security Zone 3 checkpoint and proceed to the airport for the flight to Berlin. They succeeded in getting away before clarity of the events could be established by the military and security personnel at the Wolf's Lair complex.

== Gallery ==
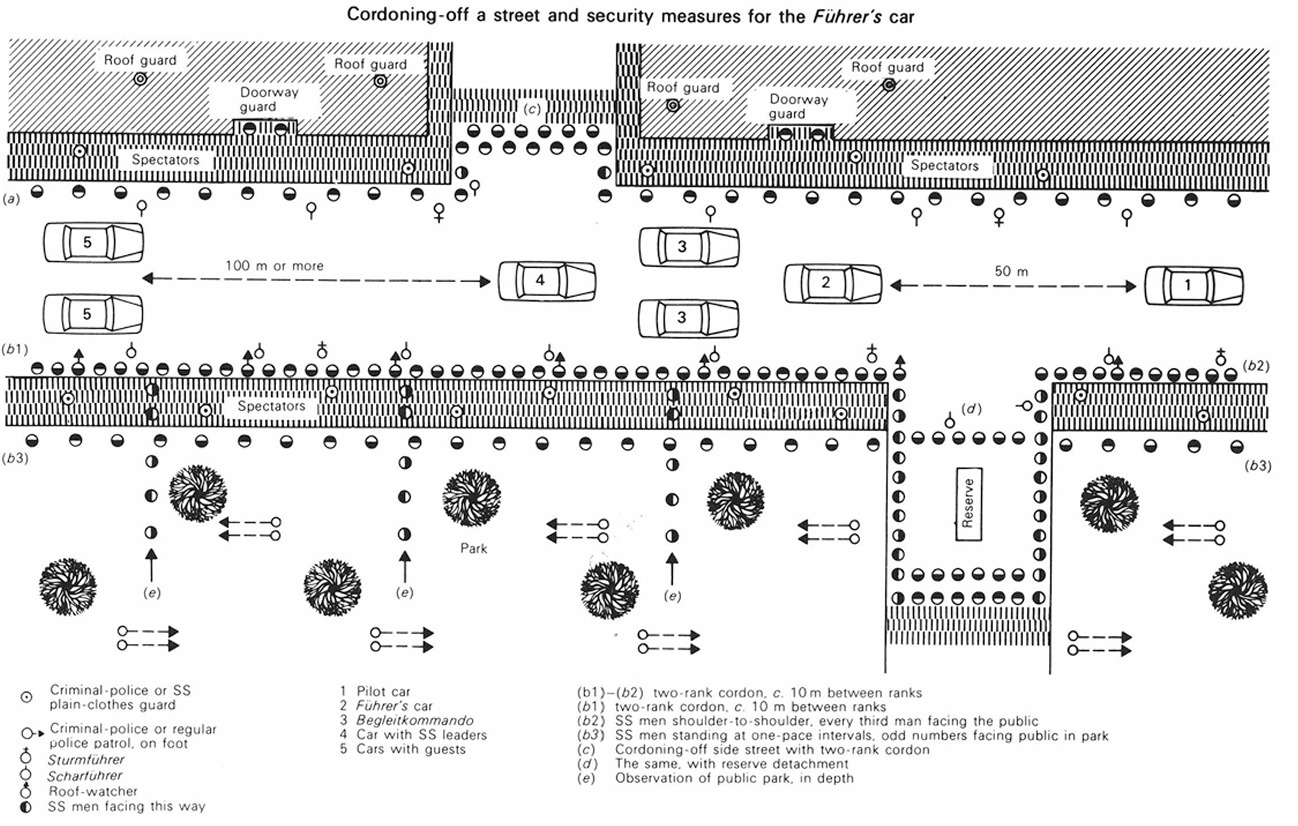
Diagram for cordoning-off a street and security measures for the Fuhrer's car

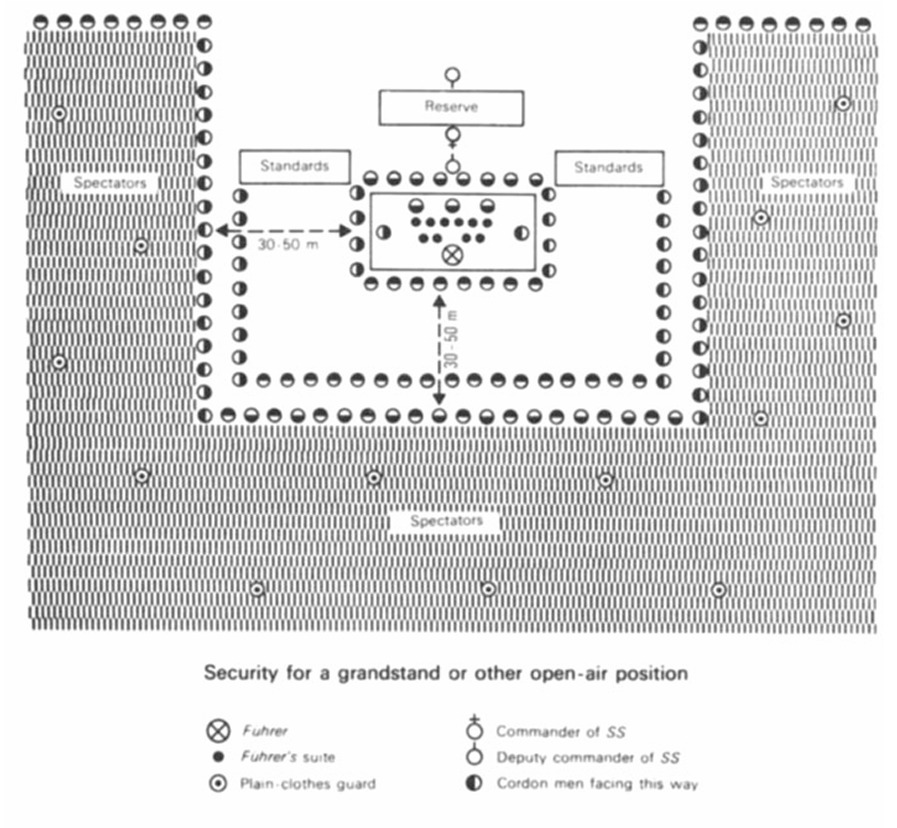
Diagram as to security for a grandstand or other open-air position
