= Westerheim, Baden-Württemberg =

Westerheim
- Municipality
- Coat of arms

- Location of Westerheim within Alb-Donau-Kreis district
- Interactive map of Westerheim
- Location within Germany Location within Baden-Württemberg
- Coordinates: 48°30′54″N 9°37′25″E
- Country: Germany
- State: Baden-Württemberg
- Admin. region: Tübingen
- District: Alb-Donau-Kreis

Government
  - Mayor (2018–26): Hartmut Walz

Area
  - Total: 22.91 km^{2} (8.85 sq mi)
- Elevation: 815 m (2,674 ft)

Population (2025-12-31)
  - Total: 3,103
  - Density: 135.4/km^{2} (350.8/sq mi)
- Time zone: UTC+01:00 (CET)
  - Summer (DST): UTC+02:00 (CEST)
- Postal codes: 72589
- Dialling codes: 07333
- Vehicle registration: UL
- Website: www.westerheim.de

Westerheim (German pronunciation: [ˈvɛstɐhaɪm]) is a municipality in the district of Alb-Donau in Baden-Württemberg in Germany.

== Location ==
It is located at a height of 800 meters on the Swabian Jura, about 30 Kilometers north-west of Ulm.

== History ==
Its origins stretch back to the Middle Ages. The Dukes of Helfenstein introduced the Reformation between 1555 and 1567, but Westerheim reverted to Catholicism. Today its inhabitants are mainly Roman Catholic, though the surrounding villages are Evangelical.

In 1911-12 Westerheim received electricity.

It was badly damaged in April 1945, when German Army units made a stand there. Before leaving they detonated their explosives which were stored in local barns (Stuttgart State Archives).

2011: Celebration for 1150 years of Westerheim.

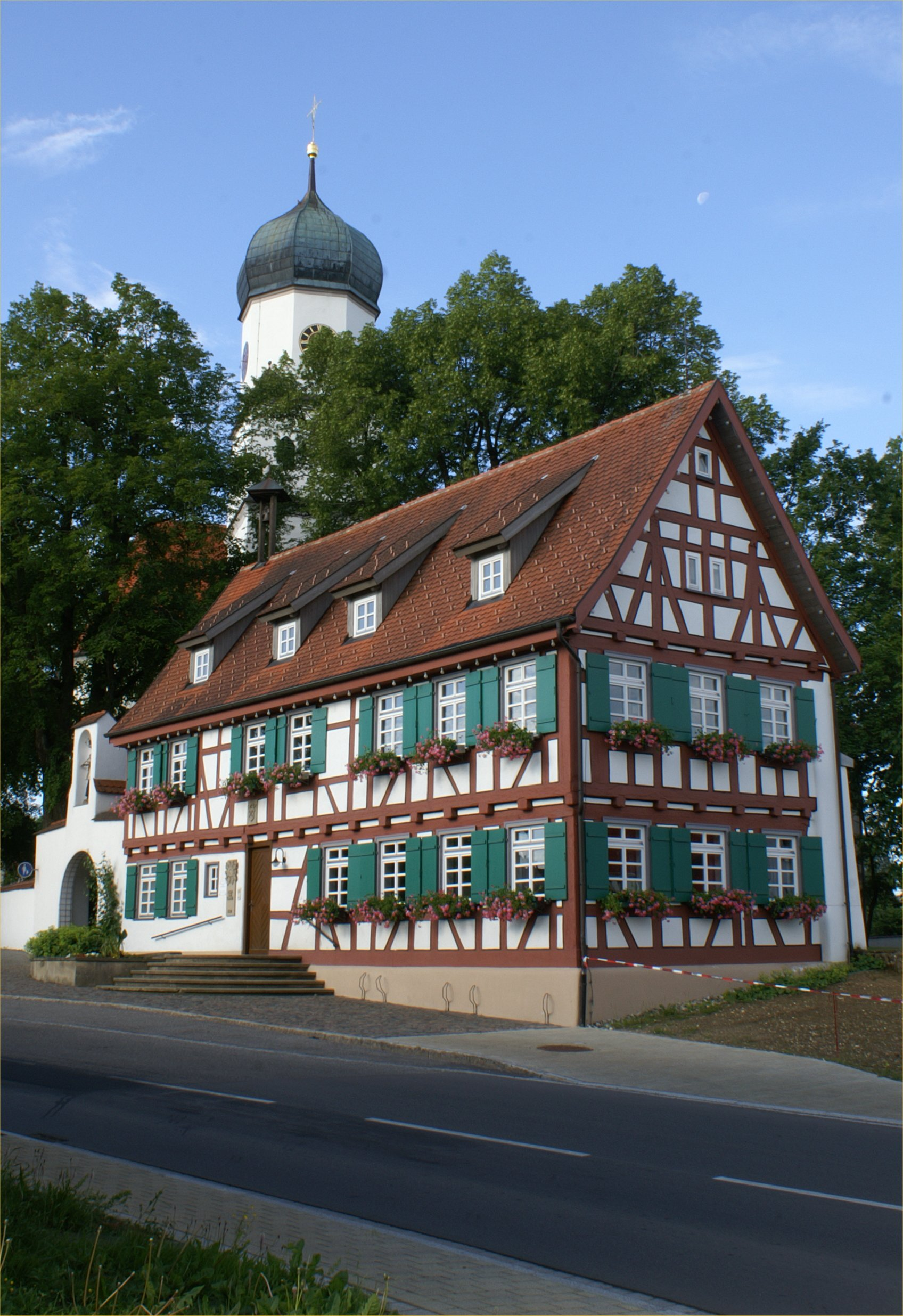
Westerheim

== Economy ==
Westerheim is a Luftkurort (“fresh-air health resort”). It is a ski resort in the Winter. There is a large camping area nearby.

== Sight-seeing ==
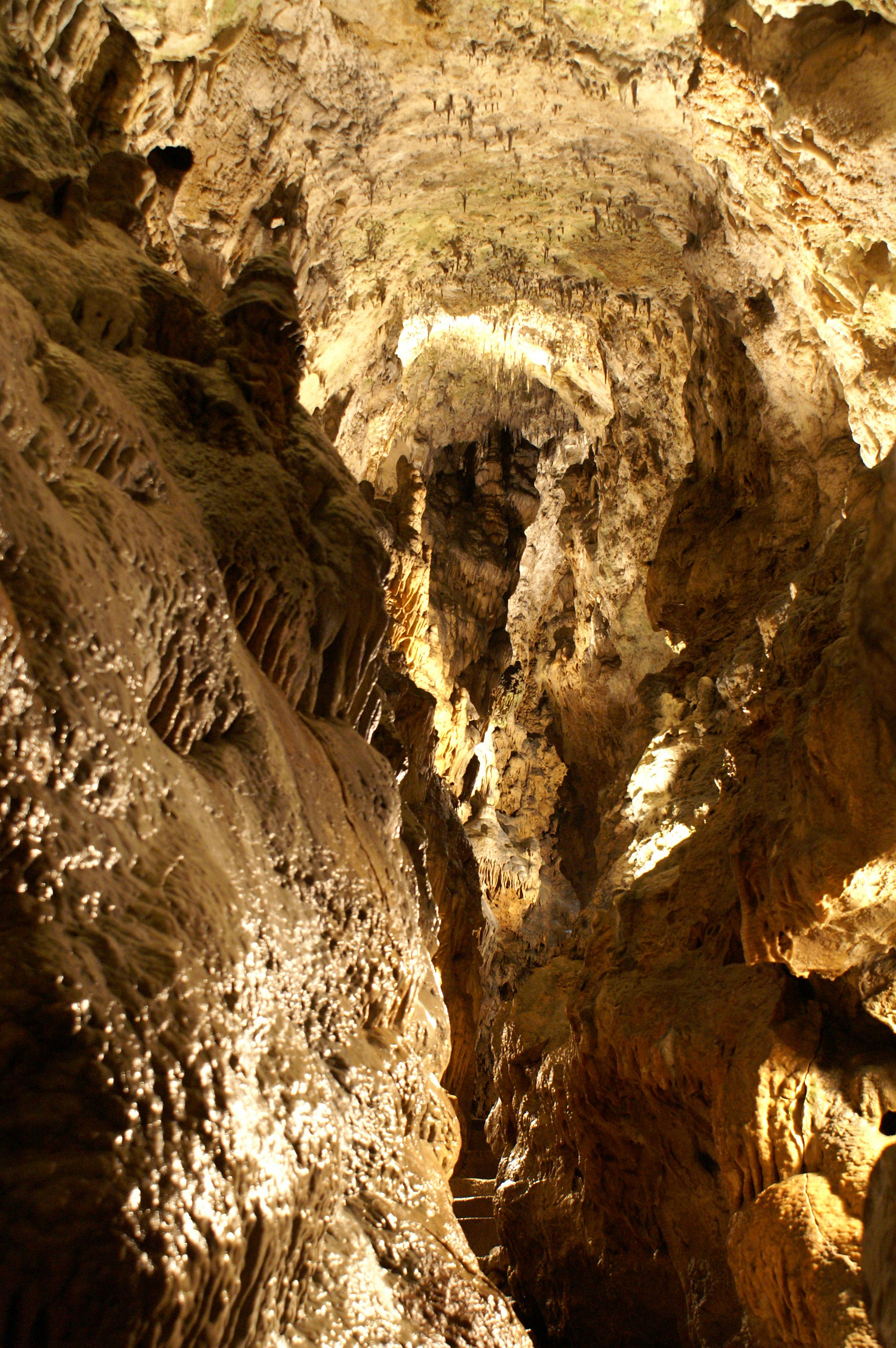
Schertelshöhle

- The church of St. Stephen, constructed in 1777/1778, has a barock high altar.
- The "Schertelshöhle" cave is a 212-meter long cave with stalactites. It is illuminated and can be visited daily from May to October.
- The "Steinerne Haus" (house of stone) is a 55-meter long cave with an 8-meter high entrance, located close to the Schertelshöhle. In winter hundreds of large icicles are formed here, which melt in the spring. Part of the cave is closed off in winter, to house hibernating animals.

=== Sons and daughters of the city ===
- Franz Schädle (1906-1945), German SS leader and last commander of the Führerbegleitkommando
