= Death of Adolf Hitler =

1945 suicide of German dictator

- Part of World War II in Europe
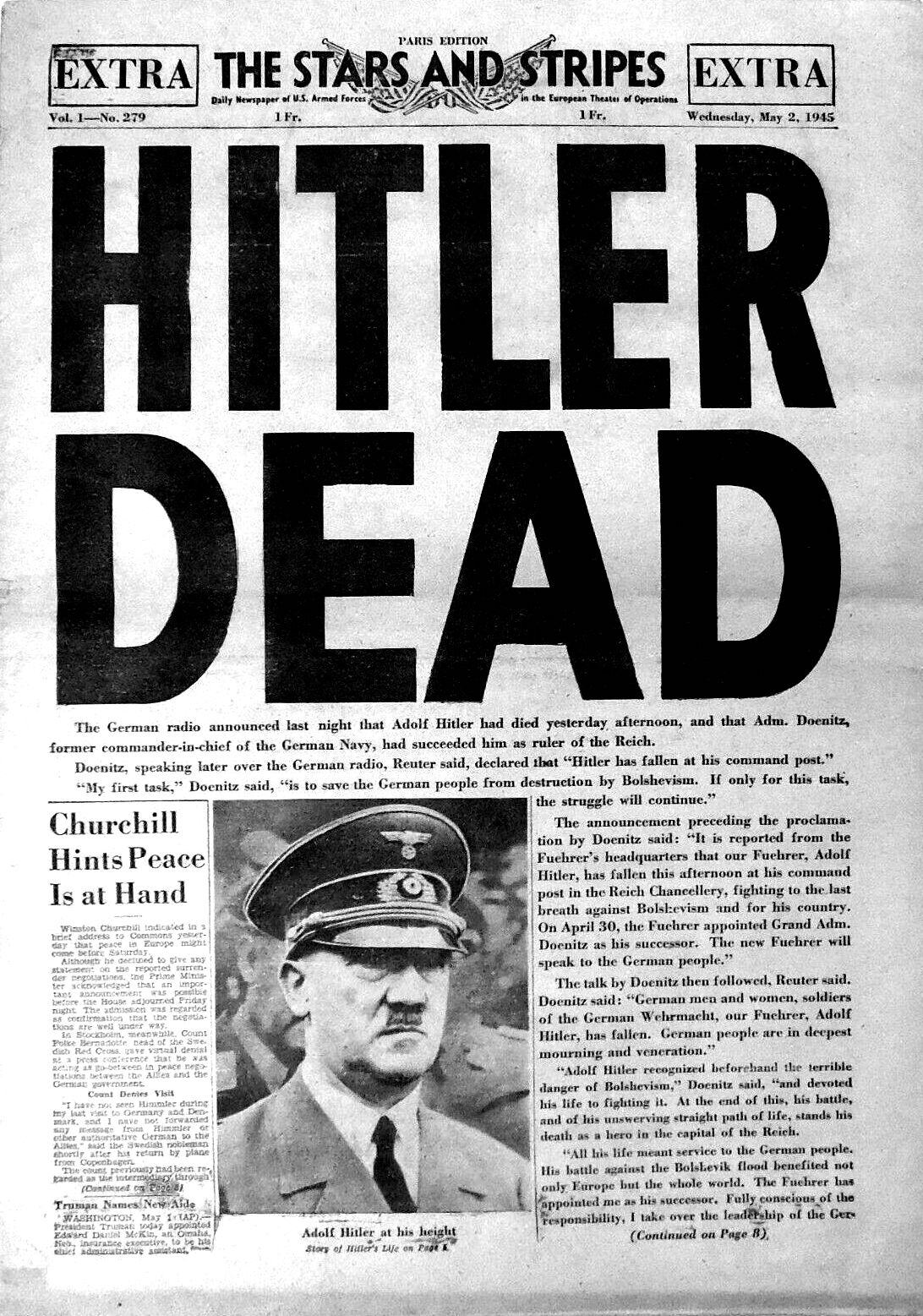
- Front page of the American military newspaper Stars and Stripes on 2 May 1945
- Date: 30 April 1945; 81 years ago
- Time: c. 15:30–15:50 (CEST; GMT+2)
- Location: Führerbunker, Berlin, Germany; 52°30′45″N 13°22′52″E
- Type: Suicide by gunshot (Adolf); Suicide by poisoning (Eva)
- Motive: Impending defeat of Germany and the Nazi Party during the Battle of Berlin; Fear of being captured by the Soviet Union; Concerns after Benito Mussolini's execution
- Outcome: Cremation of Hitler's corpse outside of the Reich Chancellery
- Deaths: 2 (Hitler and Eva Braun)
- Weapon: 7.65-mm Walther PP (Adolf); Cyanide (Eva)

On 30 April 1945, Adolf Hitler committed suicide by gunshot (Note: "... 30 April ... During the afternoon Hitler shot himself..." (MI5 staff 2011).) (Note: "... most Soviet accounts have held that Hitler also [in addition to Braun] ended his life by poison ... there are contradictions in the Soviet story ... these contradictions tend to indicate that the Soviet version of Hitler's suicide has a political colouration." (Fest 1974, p. 749).) in the Führerbunker when it became clear that Germany would lose the Battle of Berlin, which resulted in Germany's surrender to the Allies and the end of World War II in Europe. His wife Eva Braun, whom he had married the day before, committed suicide with him via cyanide poisoning. (Note: "... her lips puckered from the poison." (Beevor 2002, p. 359).) That afternoon—in accordance with Hitler's prior written and oral instructions—the couple's corpses were carried out of the Führerbunker and cremated in the garden of the Reich Chancellery. His death was announced in German radio broadcasts on 1 May. Hitler had served as the Führer of Germany since 1933 and of the Nazi Party since 1921.

Witnesses who saw Hitler's body immediately after his suicide testified that he died from a self-inflicted gunshot wound, presumably to his temple. (Note: "... Günsche stated he entered the study to inspect the bodies, and observed Hitler ... sat ... sunken over, with blood dripping out of his right temple. He had shot himself with his own pistol, a PPK 7.65." (Fischer 2008, p. 47).) (Note: "... blood dripped from a bullet hole in his right temple ..." (Kershaw 2008, p. 955).) (Note: "... the version involving a 'shot in the mouth' with secondary injuries to the temples must be rejected ... the overwhelming majority of witnesses saw an entry wound in the temple ... according to all witnesses... there were allegedly no injuries to the back of Hitler's head." (Joachimsthaler 1999, p. 166).) Hitler's personal adjutant Otto Günsche testified that while Braun's body smelled strongly of burnt almonds—an indication of cyanide poisoning—there was no such odour about Hitler's body, which instead smelled of gunpowder. Dental remains found in the Chancellery garden were matched with Hitler's records in May 1945 (Note: "... the only thing to remain of Hitler was a gold bridge with porcelain facets from his upper jaw and the lower jawbone [fragment] with some teeth and two bridges." (Joachimsthaler 1999, p. 225).) and are the only portion of Hitler's body that are known to have been found.

The Soviet Union restricted the circulation of information about Hitler's death and released many conflicting reports on the subject. Historians have largely rejected or have attempted to reconcile these reports as part of a deliberate disinformation campaign by Joseph Stalin to sow confusion. (Note: "New versions of Hitler's fate were presented by the Soviet Union according to the political needs of the moment." (Eberle & Uhl 2005, p. 288).) (Note: "The intentionally misleading account of Hitler's death by cyanide poisoning put about by Soviet historians ... can be dismissed." (Kershaw 2001, p. 1037).) (Note: "... we have a fair answer ... to the version of ... Russian author Lev Bezymenski ... Hitler did shoot himself and did bite into the cyanide capsule, just as Professor Haase had clearly and repeatedly instructed ... " (O'Donnell 2001, pp. 322–323).) Soviet records allege that the burnt remains of Hitler and Braun were recovered, (Note: "... [the bodies] were deposited ... in an unmarked grave in a forest far to the west of Berlin, reburied in 1946 in a plot of land in Magdeburg." (Kershaw 2008, p. 958).) (Note: "In 1970, the Kremlin finally decided to dispose of the body in absolute secrecy... the body, which had been concealed beneath a Soviet army parade-ground in Magdeburg, was exhumed at night and burned." (Beevor 2002, p. 431).) which does not agree with witness accounts that the bodies were almost completely reduced to ashes. (Note: According to some early historians, bones do not wholly disintegrate even during indoor cremation. (Trevor-Roper 2002, p. 182; Bullock 1962, p. 800). This same conclusion was reached by certain scientific studies. (Castillo et al. 2013; Benecke 2022). Moreover, Hitler's dental remains partially comprise intact bone. (Charlier et al. 2018).) In June 1945, the Soviets began promulgating two contradictory narratives: that Hitler died by cyanide (Note: This cannot be verified because no dissection of internal organs was recorded in the autopsy report. (Petrova & Watson 1995, p. 81).) or that he had survived and fled to another country. West Germany issued a death certificate for Hitler in 1956 following an extensive review. However, conspiracy theories about Hitler's death continue to attract interest.

== Preceding events ==
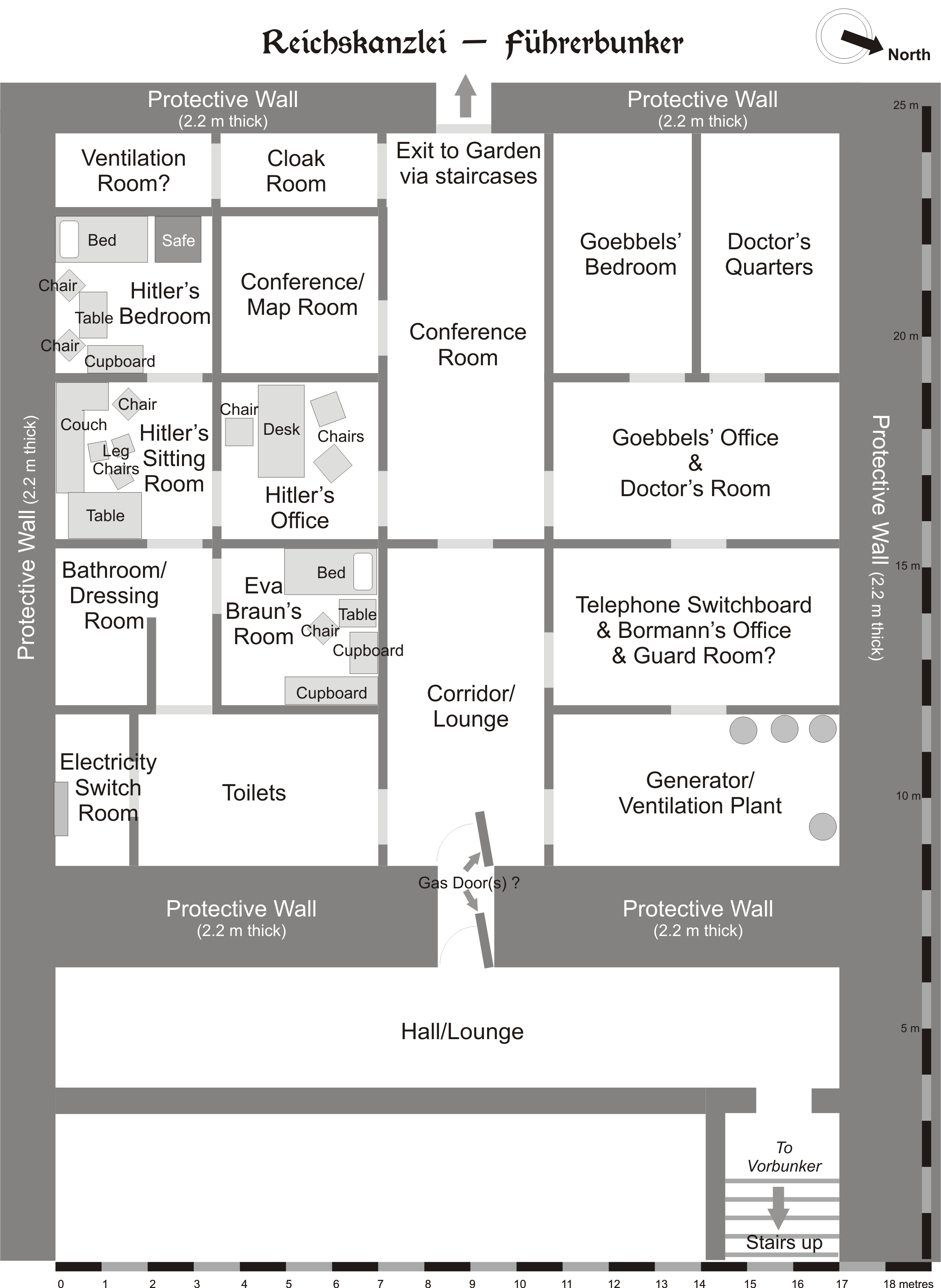
Schematic diagram of the Führerbunker

By early 1945, Nazi Germany was on the verge of total military collapse. Poland had fallen to the advancing Soviet Red Army, which was preparing to cross the Oder between Küstrin and Frankfurt-an-der-Oder with the objective of capturing Berlin 82 kilometres (51 mi) to the west. German forces had recently lost to the Allies in the Ardennes Offensive, with British and Canadian forces crossing the Rhine into the German industrial heartland of the Ruhr. US forces in the south had captured Lorraine and were advancing towards Mainz, Mannheim, and the Rhine. German forces in Italy were withdrawing north, as they were pressed by United States and Commonwealth forces as part of the Spring Offensive to advance across the Po and into the foothills of the Alps.

Hitler retreated to the Führerbunker in Berlin on 16 January 1945. It was clear to the Nazi leadership that the Battle of Berlin would be the final battle of the war in Europe. Some 325,000 soldiers of Germany's Army Group B were surrounded and captured in the Ruhr Pocket on 18 April, leaving the path open for US forces to reach Berlin. By 11 April, the Americans crossed the Elbe, 100 kilometres (62 mi) to the west of the city. On 16 April, Soviet forces to the east crossed the Oder and commenced the battle for the Seelow Heights, the last major defensive line protecting Berlin on that side. By 19 April, the Germans were in full retreat from the Seelow Heights, leaving no front line. Berlin was bombarded by Soviet artillery for the first time on 20 April, Hitler's birthday. By the evening of 21 April, Red Army tanks had reached the outskirts of the city.

On 21 April, Hitler ordered a special detachment commanded by SS-Obergruppenführer Felix Steiner to counterattack the Soviets. At the next day's afternoon situation conference, Hitler suffered a nervous collapse when he was informed that these orders had not been obeyed. He launched into a tirade against his generals, calling them treacherous and incompetent, culminating in a declaration – for the first time – that the war was lost. Hitler announced that he would stay in Berlin until the end and then shoot himself. Later that day, he asked SS physician Werner Haase about the most reliable method of suicide. Haase suggested the "pistol-and-poison method" of combining a dose of cyanide with a gunshot to the head. Luftwaffe chief Reichsmarschall Hermann Göring learned about Hitler's admission of defeat and declaration of his intended suicide and sent a telegram to Hitler, asking for permission to take over the leadership of the Reich in accordance with Hitler's 1941 decree naming him as his successor. Hitler's secretary Martin Bormann convinced Hitler that the letter from Göring was an attempt to overthrow the dictator. In response, Hitler informed Göring that he would be executed unless he resigned all of his posts. Later that day, he sacked Göring from all of his offices and ordered his arrest. Hitler also ordered his chief aide and adjutant, Julius Schaub, to destroy safeguarded documents and his personal train.

By 27 April, Berlin's communication had been all but cut off from the rest of Germany. Secure radio contact with defending units had been lost; the command staff in the Führerbunker had to depend on telephone lines for passing instructions and orders, and on public radio for news and information. On 28 April, Hitler received a BBC report originating from Reuters: it stated that Reichsführer-SS Heinrich Himmler had offered to surrender to the western Allies. The offer was declined. Himmler had implied to the Allies that he had the authority to negotiate a surrender, which Hitler considered to be treason. That afternoon, Hitler's anger and bitterness escalated into a rage against Himmler. He ordered Himmler's arrest and had SS-Gruppenführer Hermann Fegelein (Himmler's SS representative at Hitler's headquarters) shot for desertion.

By this time, the Red Army had advanced to the Potsdamer Platz, roughly a kilometre away from the bunker, and all indications were that they were preparing to storm the Reich Chancellery. This report and Himmler's betrayal prompted Hitler to make the last decisions of his life. Shortly after midnight on 29 April, he married Eva Braun in a small civil ceremony in a map room within the Führerbunker. The two then hosted a modest wedding breakfast, after which Hitler took his secretary Traudl Junge to another room and dictated his last will and testament. It left instructions to be carried out immediately following his death, with Grand Admiral Karl Dönitz and Joseph Goebbels assuming Hitler's roles as head of state and chancellor, respectively. Hitler signed these documents at 04:00 and then went to bed. Some sources say that he dictated the last will and testament immediately before the wedding, but all agree on the timing of the signing. (Note: Using sources available to Trevor-Roper (a World War II MI5 agent and historian/author of The Last Days of Hitler), MI5 records the marriage as taking place after Hitler had dictated the last will and testament. (MI5 staff 2011).) (Note: Beevor 2002, p. 343 records the marriage as taking place before Hitler had dictated the last will and testament.)

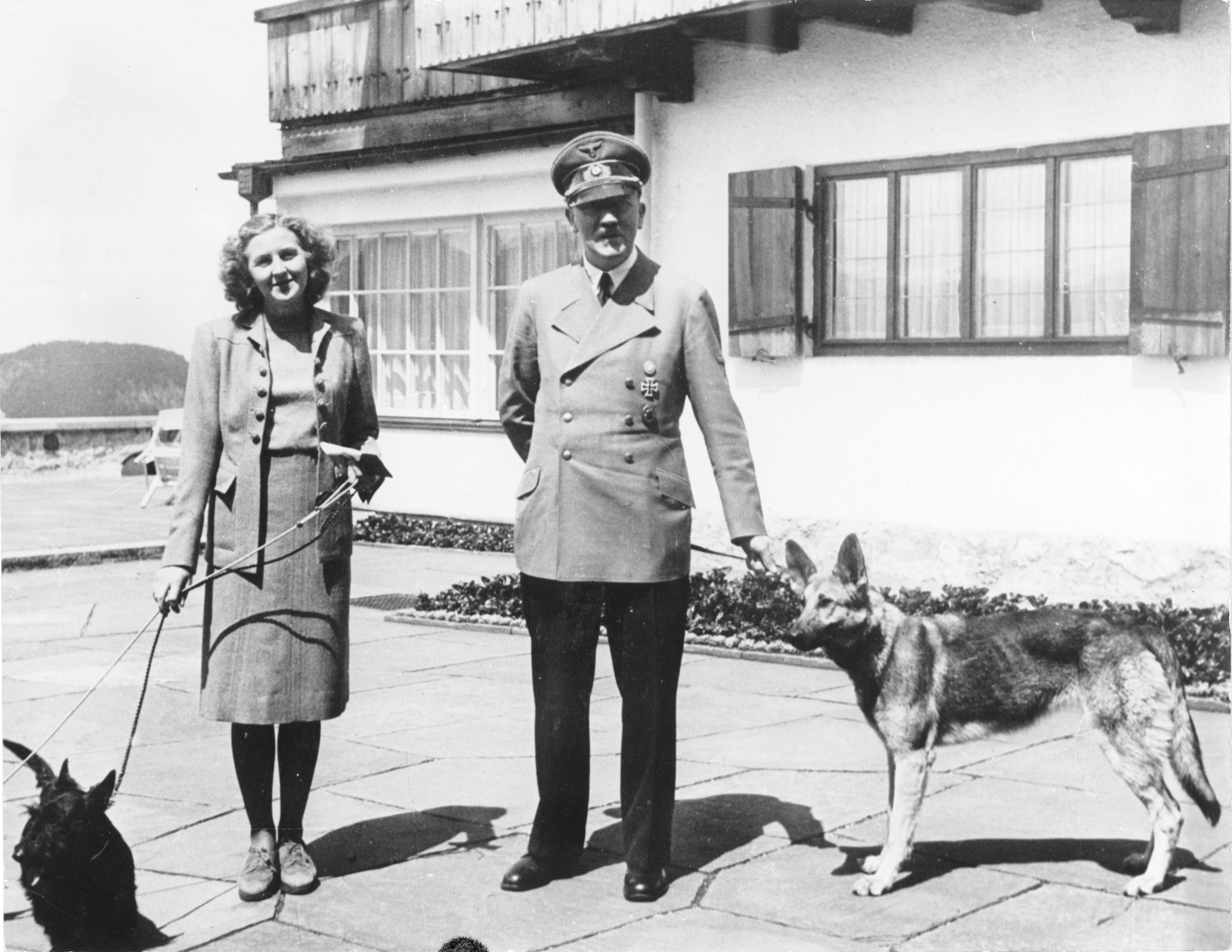
Eva Braun and Hitler at Berchtesgaden (with Hitler's dog Blondi at right), June 1942

On the afternoon of 29 April, Hitler learned that his ally, Benito Mussolini, had been summarily executed by Italian partisans. The bodies of Mussolini and his mistress, Clara Petacci, were dumped in a plaza in Milan, where they were desecrated and eventually strung up by their heels at a petrol station. The corpses were later cut down and thrown into the gutter, where they were mocked and further mutilated by Italian dissidents. These events may have strengthened Hitler's resolve not to allow himself or his wife to be made a "spectacle" of, as he had earlier recorded in his testament. (Note: It is unknown how much of this was communicated to Hitler. (Shirer 1960, p. 1131).) Hitler had been given some capsules of prussic acid by Himmler through SS physician Ludwig Stumpfegger, and initially had intended to use them for his suicide. When he received the news that Himmler had contacted the Allies through Swedish diplomat Folke Bernadotte to arrange for an end to the war, Hitler was outraged. With this betrayal in his mind, Hitler began to doubt whether the ampoules would be effective. He ordered Haase to test one on his dog Blondi. The capsule worked – the dog died instantly.

== Suicide ==
Hitler and Braun lived together as husband and wife in the bunker for less than 40 hours. By 01:00 on 30 April, Field Marshal Wilhelm Keitel had reported that all of the forces on which Hitler had been depending to rescue Berlin had either been encircled or forced onto the defensive. At around 02:30, Hitler appeared in the corridor where about twenty people, mostly women, were assembled to give their farewells. He went down the line, shaking hands and speaking with each of them, before retiring to his quarters. Late in the morning, with the Soviets less than 500 metres (1,600 ft) from the Führerbunker, Hitler had a meeting with General Helmuth Weidling, the commander of the Berlin Defence Area. Weidling told Hitler that the garrison would likely run out of ammunition that night, and that the fighting in Berlin would inevitably come to an end within the next 24 hours. Weidling asked for permission for a breakout; this was a request he had unsuccessfully made before. Hitler did not answer, and Weidling went back to his headquarters in the Bendlerblock. At about 13:00, he received Hitler's permission to attempt a breakout that night. Hitler, two secretaries, and his personal cook then had lunch, after which Hitler and Braun said goodbye to members of the bunker staff and fellow occupants, including Bormann, Goebbels, the secretaries, and several military officers. At around 14:30 Adolf and Eva Hitler went into his personal study. Hitler's adjutant SS-Sturmbannführer Otto Günsche stood guard outside the study door.

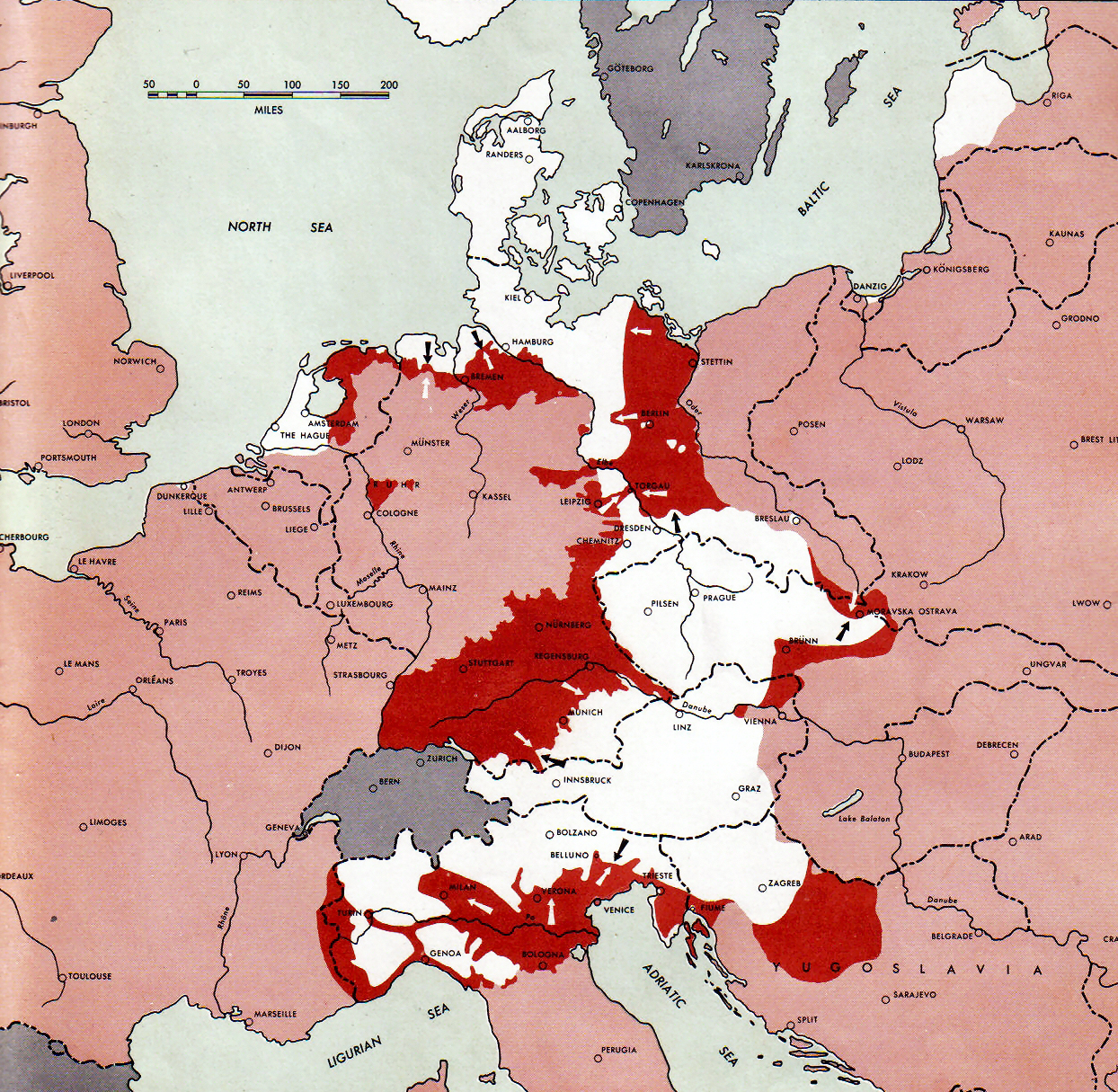
Situation of World War II in Europe at the time of Hitler's death. The white areas were controlled by Nazi forces, the pink areas were controlled by the Allies, and the red areas indicate recent Allied advances.

After some time, Hitler's valet, Heinz Linge, entered the antechamber to Hitler's quarters, where he discovered the door closed and allegedly smelled gunpowder smoke. Linge went back out to the corridor where Bormann was standing, and the two then entered the study together. Linge later stated that while in the room he immediately noted a scent of burnt almonds, which is a common observation in the presence of hydrogen cyanide. Linge saw the bodies of Hitler and Braun sitting upright on the sofa, with Hitler to Braun's right. His head was canted to his right. Günsche entered the study shortly afterwards, later stating that Hitler "sat... sunken over, with blood dripping out of his right temple. He had shot himself with his own pistol." According to Linge, the 7.65-mm weapon was a Walther PP or PPK, while Günsche specified it was the latter. The gun lay at his feet. Hitler's dripping blood had made a large stain on the right arm of the sofa and was pooling on the rug. According to Linge, Braun's body had no visible wounds, and her face showed how she had died – from cyanide poisoning. (Note: "Cyanide poisoning. Its 'bite' was marked in her features." (Linge 2009, p. 199).) Günsche and SS-Brigadeführer Wilhelm Mohnke stated "unequivocally" that all outsiders and those performing duties and work in the bunker "did not have any access" to Hitler's private living quarters during the time of death (between 15:00 and 16:00).

Günsche left the study and announced that Hitler was dead to a group in the briefing room, which included Goebbels and Generals Hans Krebs and Wilhelm Burgdorf. These three, in addition to others including Hitler Youth leader Artur Axmann, viewed the bodies. Linge and another man rolled up Hitler's body in a blanket, and then, in accordance with Hitler's prior written and oral instructions, his and Braun's bodies were carried up the stairs and through the bunker's emergency exit to the garden behind the Reich Chancellery, where they were to be burned with petrol. Although Hitler's corpse was partially covered by the blanket, numerous witnesses testified to recognising him, as the top of his head was not covered, nor were his lower legs and feet.

The bunker telephone operator SS-Oberscharführer Rochus Misch reported Hitler's death to Führerbegleitkommando (Führer Escort Command) chief Franz Schädle and returned to the switchboard, later recalling someone shouting that Hitler's body was being burned. After the first attempts to ignite the petrol did not work, Linge went back inside the bunker and returned with a thick roll of papers. Bormann lit the papers and threw them onto the bodies. As the two corpses caught fire, a group including Bormann, Günsche, Linge, Goebbels, Erich Kempka, Peter Högl, Ewald Lindloff, and Hans Reisser raised their arms in salute as they stood just inside the bunker doorway.

At around 16:15, Linge ordered SS-Untersturmführer Heinz Krüger and SS-Oberscharführer Werner Schwiedel to roll up the rug in Hitler's study to burn it. Schwiedel later stated that upon entering the study, he saw a pool of blood the size of a "large dinner plate" by the arm-rest of the sofa. Noticing a spent cartridge case, he bent down and picked it up from where it lay on the rug about 1 metre (3 ft) from a 7.65 pistol. The two men removed the blood-stained rug and carried it up the stairs and outside to the Chancellery garden, where it was placed on the ground and burned.

The Red Army shelled the area in and around the Reich Chancellery on and off during the afternoon. SS guards brought over additional cans of petrol to further burn the corpses. Although the corpses were being burned in the open, where the distribution of heat varies (as opposed to in a crematorium), according to eyewitnesses, the copious amount of fuel applied from about 16:00 to 18:30 reduced the remains to something between charred bones and piles of ashes which fell apart to the touch. At approximately 18:30, Lindloff (and perhaps Reisser) covered up the ashen remains in a shallow bomb crater. The shelling and a fire from napalm incendiary bombs continued until 2 May. During this period it was difficult to spend any time in the garden due to the continuous shelling.

== Aftermath ==
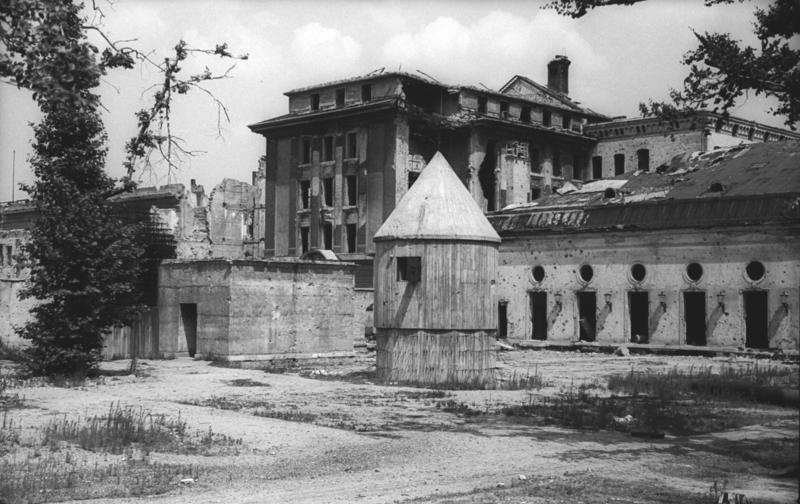
Exterior of the Führerbunker shortly before its destruction. Hitler and Braun's remains were burnt in a shell crater outside the emergency exit at the left.

Krebs met Soviet general Vasily Chuikov just prior to 04:00 on 1 May, giving him the news of Hitler's death, while attempting to negotiate a ceasefire and open "peace negotiations". Joseph Stalin was informed of Hitler's suicide around 04:05 Berlin time, thirteen hours after the event. He demanded unconditional surrender, which Krebs lacked authorisation to give. Stalin wanted confirmation that Hitler was dead and ordered the Red Army's counterespionage unit, SMERSH, to find his corpse.

The first evidence to the outside world that Hitler was dead came from the Germans themselves. On the night of 1 May, the Reichssender Hamburg radio station interrupted their normal program to announce that Hitler had died that afternoon, (Note: Hitler had actually died the previous day. (Shirer 1960, p. 1137).) and introduced his successor, Dönitz. Dönitz called upon the German people to mourn their Führer, whom he stated had died a hero defending the capital of the Reich. Hoping to save the army and the nation by negotiating a partial surrender to the British and Americans, Dönitz authorised a fighting withdrawal to the west. His tactic was somewhat successful: it enabled about 1.8 million German soldiers to avoid capture by the Soviets, but came at a high cost in bloodshed, as troops continued to fight until 8 May.

Hitler's dental remains: a maxillar bridge made mostly of gold (top right) and part of a mandible broken and burnt around the alveolar process (bottom three fragments)

In the early morning hours of 2 May, the Soviets captured the Reich Chancellery. Inside the Führerbunker, Krebs and Burgdorf committed suicide by gunshot. In early May, Hitler's and Braun's dental remains were extracted from the soil. (Note: According to the Soviets, the discovery of the body of a look-alike of Hitler late on 3 May delayed the purported exhumation of the burnt remains of Hitler and Braun from 4 May to the following day. (Petrova & Watson 1995, pp. 52–53).) Stalin was wary of believing Hitler was dead and restricted the release of information to the public. By 11 May, dental assistant Käthe Heusermann and dental technician Fritz Echtmann, both of whom had worked for Hitler's dentist Hugo Blaschke, (Note: Heusermann helped locate Hitler's X-rays and directed the Soviets to Echtmann, who had made Hitler's bridges. (Petrova & Watson 1995, pp. 56–57).) identified the dental remains of Hitler and Braun. Both would spend years in Soviet prisons. An alleged Soviet autopsy of Hitler made public in 1968 was used by forensic odontologists Reidar F. Sognnaes and Ferdinand Strøm to confirm the authenticity of Hitler's dental remains in 1972. In 2017, French forensic pathologist Philippe Charlier also found the dental remains in the Soviet archives, including teeth on part of a jawbone, to be in "perfect agreement" with X-rays taken of Hitler in 1944. Charlier used electron microscopy to examine the tartar, which contained only plant fibres, a detail consistent with Hitler's vegetarianism. In May 2018, the European Journal of Internal Medicine published a paper co-authored by Charlier and four other researchers, which concluded that these remains "cannot be a fake", citing their significant wear. No gunpowder residue was detected, indicating that Hitler did not die by a gunshot wound through the mouth, as Axmann contended.

In early June 1945, SMERSH moved the remains of several individuals, including the Goebbels family (Joseph, Magda, and their children), from Buch to Finow. Hitler and Braun's remains were alleged to have been moved as well, but this is most likely Soviet disinformation. There is no evidence that any bodily remains of Hitler or Braun – with the exception of the dental remains – were found by the Soviets. The remains of the Goebbels family and others were buried in a forest in Brandenburg on 3 June 1945, then exhumed and moved to SMERSH's new facility in Magdeburg, where they were re-buried in February 1946. By 1970, the facility was under KGB control and scheduled to be relinquished to East Germany. Concerned that a known Nazi burial site might become a neo-Nazi shrine, KGB director Yuri Andropov authorised an operation to exhume and destroy the decaying remains. On 4 April 1970, a KGB team thoroughly cremated them and cast the ashes into the Biederitz river, a tributary of the nearby Elbe. (Note: Beevor states that "... the ashes were flushed into the town [Magdeburg] sewage system." (Beevor 2002, p. 431).)

For politically motivated reasons, the Soviet Union presented various versions of Hitler's fate. On 5 June 1945, the Soviets claimed that his body had been examined and that he had died by cyanide poisoning. At a press conference on 9 June, the Soviets said they had not actually identified the body and that Hitler had likely escaped. When asked in July how Hitler had died, Stalin said he was living "in Spain or Argentina". In the years immediately after the war, the Soviets maintained that Hitler was not dead, but had escaped and was either being sheltered by the former western Allies or was in Francoist Spain or South America. The contentious 1947 American book Who Killed Hitler? suggests that Soviet leadership "[kept] the ghost of Hitler alive" to motivate its Communist forces to continue fighting against fascism.

In November 1945, Dick White, the head of counter-intelligence in the British sector of Berlin, had their agent Hugh Trevor-Roper investigate. His report was expanded and published in 1947 as The Last Days of Hitler. Until the mid-1950s, the US Federal Bureau of Investigation and Central Intelligence Agency investigated many claims that Hitler might still be alive, while lending none of them credence. The documents remained classified until the early 2010s, as authorised by the 1998 Nazi War Crimes Disclosure Act. The secrecy in which the investigation was shrouded helped fuel fringe theories asserting Hitler's survival. Presiding judge at the Einsatzgruppen trial at Nuremberg Michael Musmanno considered all such claims contrary to the evidence.

Between 1948 and 1952, amid denazification proceedings in West Germany, legal disputes over Hitler's former property (including The Art of Painting by Johannes Vermeer) were hindered by the lack of an official death declaration. Beginning in 1952, a federal court in Berchtesgaden interviewed 42 witnesses about Hitler's suicide – behind closed doors to avoid testimonies influencing one another. After four years of extensive review, Judge Heinrich Stephanus concluded: "There can no longer be the slightest doubt that on 30 April 1945 Adolf Hitler put an end to his life in the Chancellery by his own hand, by means of a shot into his right temple." A death certificate was issued on 25 February 1956, with an attached report of more than 1,500 pages. An 80-page expert criminological report was prepared in mid-1956, focusing on the "substantial discrepancies" between eyewitness testimonies and serving as a springboard for photographic reconstructions. Ballistic experiments were arranged to determine which interpretation of the fatal gunshot was most likely. (Note: German historian Anton Joachimsthaler, who cites some of the testimonies in his book on Hitler's death, mentions the ballistic experiments without detailing their results. (Joachimsthaler 1999, p. 161).) The declaration became public and legally binding by the year's end. Hitler's demise was entered as an assumption of death on the basis that none of the witnesses had seen his body, which German historian Anton Joachimsthaler points out is incorrect. The federal court went on to publish a summary of its findings of fact in a 1958 press release.

=== Further Soviet investigations and disinformation ===
On 11 December 1945, the Soviets allowed a limited investigation of the bunker complex grounds by the other Allied powers (Britain, France, and the US). Two representatives from each nation watched several Germans dig up soil down to the concrete roof of the bunker; the excavation included the bomb crater where Hitler's burnt remains had been buried. Found during the dig were two hats identified as Hitler's, an undergarment with Braun's initials, and some reports to Hitler from Goebbels. The Soviet People's Commissariat for Internal Affairs (NKVD) barred further excavation on the accusation that the representatives had removed documents from the Reich Chancellery.

At the end of 1945, Stalin ordered the NKVD to form a second commission to investigate Hitler's death. On 30 May 1946, agents of the NKVD's successor, the Ministry of Internal Affairs (MVD), found part of a skull in the crater where Hitler's remains had been exhumed. The remnant consists of part of the occipital bone and part of both parietal bones. The nearly complete left parietal bone has a bullet hole, apparently an exit wound. This remained uncatalogued until 1975, and was rediscovered in the Russian State Archives in 1993. In 2009, University of Connecticut archaeologist and bone specialist Nick Bellantoni examined the skull fragment, which Soviet officials believed to be Hitler's. According to Bellantoni, "The bone seemed very thin" for a male, (Note: Philippe Charlier later stated, "When doing [an examination] of the skull, you have a 55 per cent chance of getting the sex right." (Lusher 2018).) (Note: According to a scientific article co-authored by Philippe Charlier, the sex is difficult to determine due to two factors: severe heating from burning, which could have reduced the skull's thickness, and the absence of the nuchal crest. (Charlier et al. 2018).) and "the sutures where the skull plates come together seemed to correspond to someone under 40". A small piece detached from the skull was DNA-tested, as was blood from Hitler's sofa. The skull was determined to be that of a woman, while the blood sample contained male DNA. (Note: This prompted the vice president of the Russian state archive to say, "No one claimed that was Hitler's skull." (ABC News 2009).) In 2025, blood from the sofa was confirmed to be Hitler's by comparing it to the DNA of a relative with shared paternal ancestry.

On 29 December 1949, a secret dossier on Hitler was presented to Stalin, which was based upon the interrogation of Nazis who had been present in the Führerbunker, including Günsche and Linge. Western historians were allowed into the archives of the former Soviet Union beginning in 1991, but the dossier remained undiscovered for twelve years; in 2005, it was published as The Hitler Book.

In 1968, Soviet journalist Lev Bezymenski published his book, The Death of Adolf Hitler, which includes previously unreleased photographs of the dental remains. The book transcribes a purported Soviet forensic examination led by Faust Shkaravsky, which concluded that Hitler committed cyanide poisoning. Bezymenski further theorised that Hitler requested a coup de grâce to ensure his quick death, but later admitted that his work included "deliberate lies", such as the manner of Hitler's death. In 1978, American journalist James P. O'Donnell corrected the book's claim that cyanide acts instantaneously, saying Hitler could have taken poison and still had enough time to shoot himself. The book and alleged autopsy have been widely derided by Western historians. Joachimsthaler, in his extensive analysis of the circumstances surrounding Hitler's death, quotes a German pathologist as saying about the purported autopsy: "Bezemensky's report is ridiculous... Any one of my assistants would have done better... the whole thing is a farce... it is intolerably bad work... the transcript of the post-mortem section of 8 [May] 1945 describes anything but Hitler."

== Legacy ==
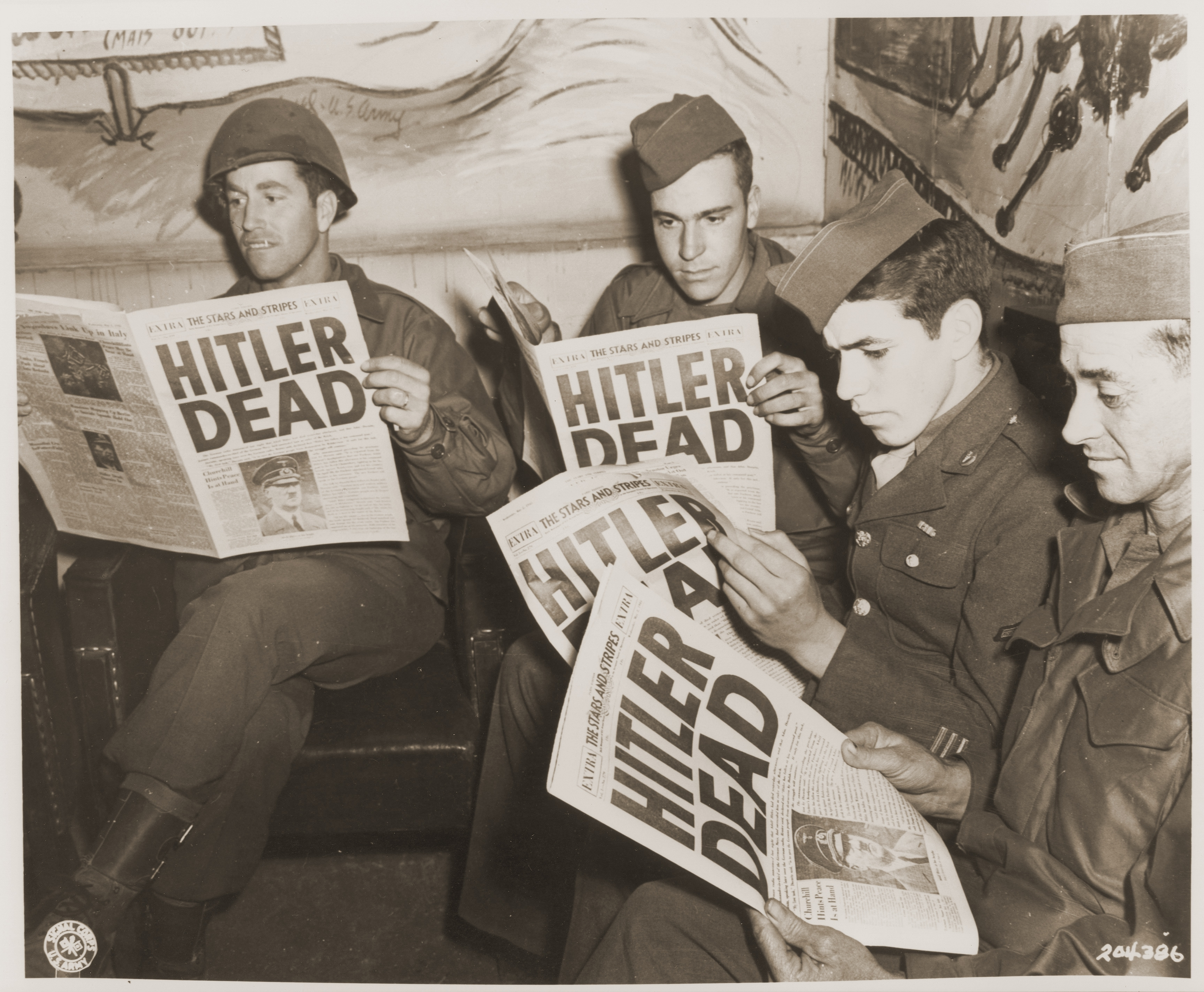
U.S. soldiers read of Hitler's death in an "extra" edition of Stars and Stripes, 2 May 1945

After Hitler's death and the end of World War II in Europe, the occupying Allies divided Germany into four zones. This led to the start of the Cold War between the Western Bloc, supported by the US, and the Eastern Bloc, supported by the Soviet Union. From 1961 until 1989, the divide was physically manifested via the Berlin Wall, followed by Germany's reunification in 1990 and the dissolution of the Soviet Union in 1991.

Following Hitler's death, war veteran and future US president John F. Kennedy wrote in his diary that the dictator "had a mystery about him in the way he lived and in the manner of his death that will live and grow after him". Historian Joachim Fest opines that the almost "traceless" death of Hitler allowed him to stay in the public eye, granting him a "bizarre afterlife"; conspiracy theories – rooted in Soviet disinformation alleging his survival – bolstered continued doubts and speculation, including outlandish tabloid and journalistic reports published into the late 20th century. Conspiracy theories about Hitler's death and about the Nazi era as a whole still attract interest, with books, TV shows, and films continuing to be produced on the topic. Historian Luke Daly-Groves wrote that Hitler's death is not about the death of one man, but carries a greater significance as to the end of the regime and the ideological impact it left behind.

== Gallery ==
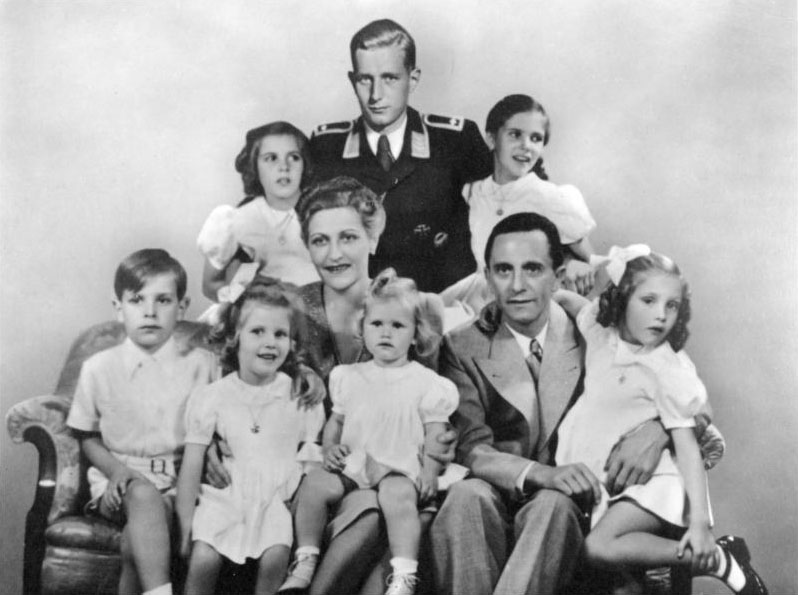
Joseph Goebbels, his wife Magda, their six children, and Magda's earlier son, Harald Quandt (the only family member to survive the war)

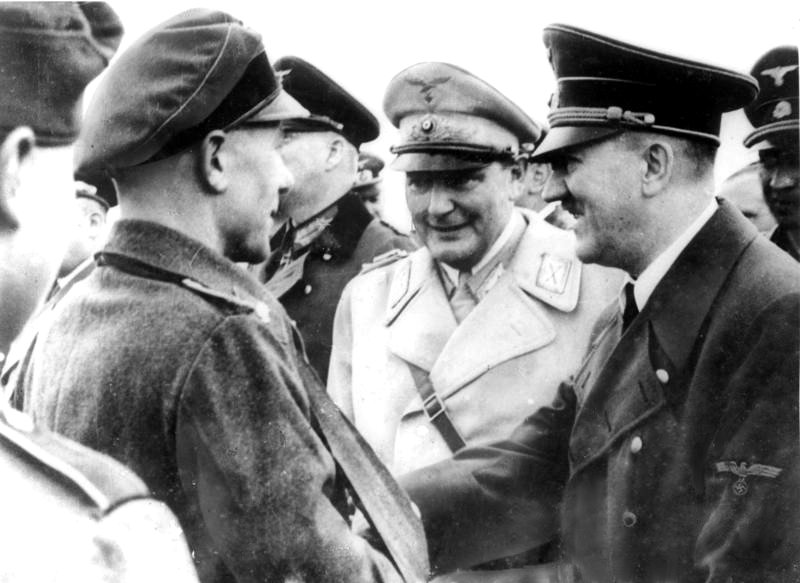
Hitler (right) visiting Berlin defenders in early April 1945 with Hermann Göring (centre) and Chief of the OKW Field Marshal Wilhelm Keitel (partially hidden)

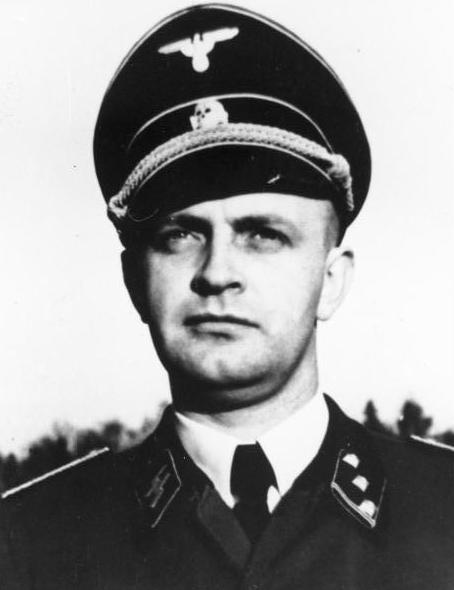
Heinz Linge, Hitler's valet, was one of the first people into Hitler's study after the suicides.

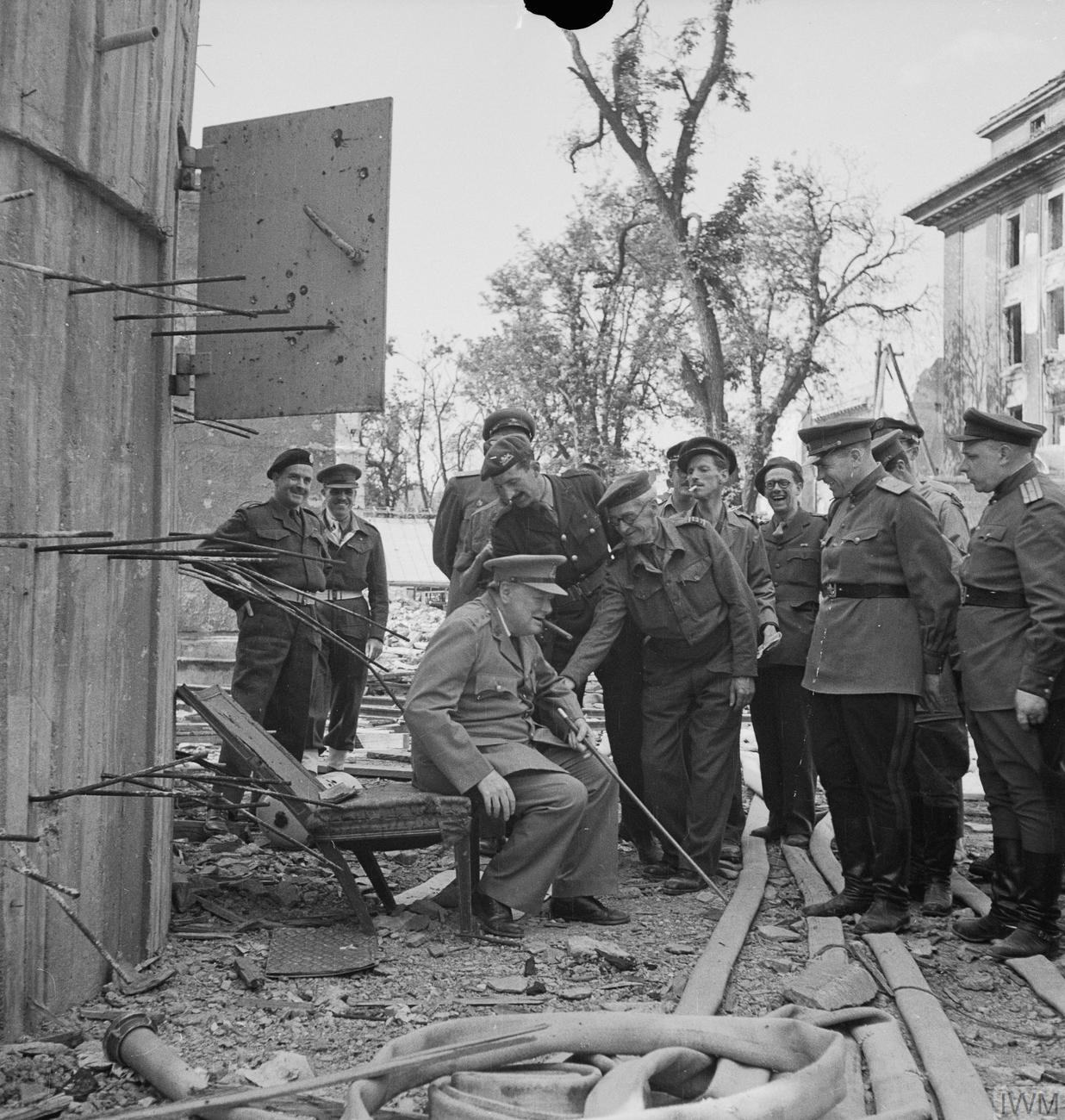
Winston Churchill sitting on a damaged chair from the Führerbunker in July 1945

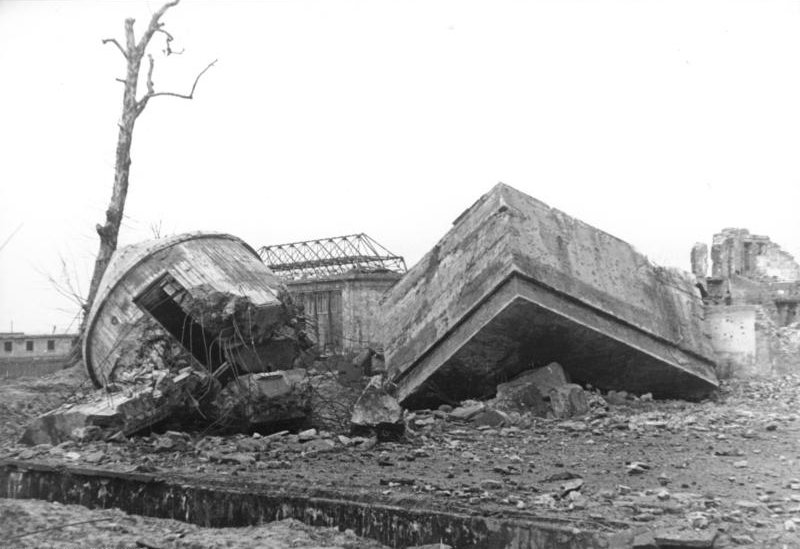
The demolished emergency exit of the Führerbunker in the Reich Chancellery garden (1947)

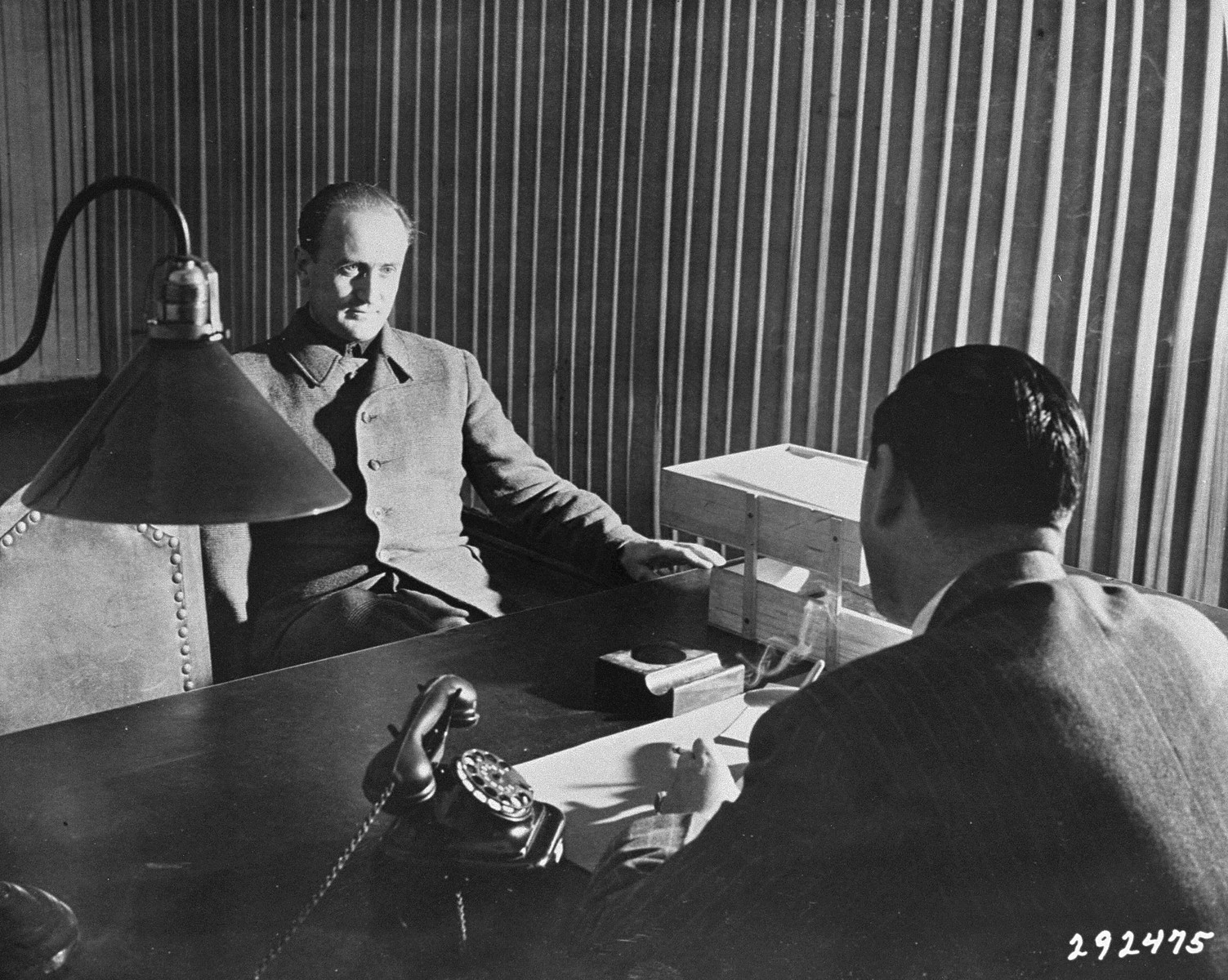
Eyewitness Artur Axmann providing details of Hitler's death in Nuremberg in 1947

== See also ==
- Führer Headquarters
- List of Nazi Party leaders and officials
- Popular culture representations of Hitler after his death
- Vorbunker

=== Media ===
- The Bunker (1981 film)
- The Bunker (book)
- Downfall (2004 film)
- Hitler: The Last Ten Days – 1973 film

== Bibliography ==
- ABC News (9 December 2009). "DNA Test Sparks Controversy Over Hitler's Remains".
- Anderson, John (10 November 2015). "One Industry That Capitalizes on America's Hitler Fascination". Fortune.
- Associated Press (30 September 2009). "Hitler's supposed skull really belongs to a woman". Canadian Broadcasting Corporation.
- Barber, Tony (1 October 2020). "The Hitler Conspiracies – why are Nazi myths flourishing?". The Financial Times.
- "JFK diary calls Hitler 'stuff of legends'". BBC News. 23 March 2017.
- Beevor, Antony (2002). Berlin – The Downfall 1945. New York: Viking-Penguin. ISBN 978-0-670-03041-5.
- Benecke, Mark (12 December 2022) [2003]. "The Hunt for Hitler's Teeth". Bizarre – via Dr. Mark Benecke.
- Beschloss, Michael (December 2002). "Dividing the Spoils". Smithsonian Magazine.
- Bezymenski, Lev (1968). The Death of Adolf Hitler (1st ed.). New York: Harcourt, Brace & World.
- Brisard, Jean-Christophe and Parshina, Lana (2018). The Death of Hitler. Boston: Da Capo Press. ISBN 978-0306922589.
- Bullock, Alan (1962) [1952]. Hitler: A Study in Tyranny. New York: Konecky & Konecky. OCLC 33389757.
- Castillo, Rafael Fernández; Ubelaker, Douglas H.; Acosta, José Antonio Lorente; de la Fuente, Guillermo A. Cañadas (March 2013). "Effects of temperature on bone tissue. Histological study of the changes in the bone matrix". Forensic Science International. 226 (1–3): 33–37. doi:10.1016/j.forsciint.2012.11.012. hdl:10481/91826. PMID 23287528.
- Charlier, P.; Weil, R.; Rainsard, P.; Poupon, J.; Brisard, J.C. (August 2018). "The remains of Adolf Hitler: A biomedical analysis and definitive identification". European Journal of Internal Medicine. 54: e10–e12. doi:10.1016/j.ejim.2018.05.014. PMID 29779904.
- CIA Chief of Station, Caracas (3 October 1955), HVCA-2592 (PDF), CIA, archived from the original (PDF) on 11 February 2017
- CIA staff (2013), Advanced Search: Nazi War Crimes Disclosure Act, CIA FOIA, archived from the original on 8 January 2019
- "Berlin Wall Fast Facts". CNN. 16 September 2013. Archived from the original on 13 November 2019.
- "Russians insist skull fragment is Hitler's". CNN. 11 December 2009. Archived from the original on 6 November 2022.
- Daley, Jason (22 May 2018). "Hitler's Teeth Confirm He Died in 1945". Smithsonian.
- Daly-Groves, Luke (2019). Hitler's Death: The Case Against Conspiracy. Oxford, UK: Osprey. ISBN 978-1-4728-3454-6.
- Dolezal, Robert (2004). Truth about History: How New Evidence Is Transforming the Story of the Past. Pleasantville, NY: Reader's Digest. pp. 185–6. ISBN 0-7621-0523-2.
- Eberle, Henrik; Uhl, Matthias, eds. (2005). The Hitler Book: The Secret Dossier Prepared for Stalin from the Interrogations of Hitler's Personal Aides. New York: Public Affairs. ISBN 978-1-58648-366-1.
- Erickson, John (1983). The Road to Berlin: Stalin's War with Germany: Volume 2. London: Weidenfeld and Nicolson. ISBN 978-0-297-77238-5.
- Evans, Richard J. (2008). The Third Reich at War. New York: Penguin Books. ISBN 978-0-14-311671-4.
- Felton, Mark (2014). Guarding Hitler: The Secret World of the Führer. London: Pen and Sword Military. ISBN 978-1-78159-305-9.
- Fest, Joachim C. (1974). Hitler. New York: Harcourt. ISBN 978-0-15-141650-9.
- Fest, Joachim (2004). Inside Hitler's Bunker: The Last Days of the Third Reich. New York: Farrar, Straus and Giroux. ISBN 978-0-374-13577-5.
- Fischer, Thomas (2008). Soldiers of the Leibstandarte. Winnipeg: J.J. Fedorowicz. ISBN 978-0-921991-91-5.
- Goñi, Uki (27 September 2009). "Tests on skull fragment cast doubt on Adolf Hitler suicide story". The Guardian. London.
- Halpin, Tony and Boyes, Roger (9 December 2009). "Battle of Hitler's skull prompts Russia to reveal all". The Times. Archived from the original on 29 June 2011.
- Hamilton, Charles (1984). Leaders and Personalities of the Third Reich: Their Biographies, Portraits, and Autographs. San Jose, CA: R. James Bender Publishing. ISBN 0-912138-27-0.
- Horrabin, J.F. (1946). Vol. X: May 1944 – August 1945. An Atlas-History of the Second Great War. Edinburgh: Thomas Nelson & Sons. OCLC 464378076.
- Isachenkov, Vladimir (20 February 1993). "Russians say they have bones from Hitler's skull". Gadsden Times. The AP.
- Joachimsthaler, Anton (1999) [1995]. The Last Days of Hitler: The Legends, The Evidence, The Truth. Translated by Helmut Bölger. London: Brockhampton Press. ISBN 978-1-86019-902-8.
- Kershaw, Ian (2001) [2000]. Hitler, 1936–1945: Nemesis. London: Penguin. ISBN 978-0-14-027239-0.
- Kershaw, Ian (2008). Hitler: A Biography. New York: W. W. Norton & Company. ISBN 978-0-393-06757-6.
- Linge, Heinz (2009) [1980]. With Hitler to the End. Frontline Books–Skyhorse Publishing. ISBN 978-1-60239-804-7.
- Lusher, Adam (20 May 2018). "Adolf Hitler really is dead: scientific study debunks conspiracy theories that he escaped to South America". The Independent.
- MI5 staff (2011). "Hitler's last days". Her Majesty's Security Service website. Archived from the original on 4 July 2015.
- Misch, Rochus (2014) [2008]. Hitler's Last Witness: The Memoirs of Hitler's Bodyguard. London: Frontline Books-Skyhorse Publishing, Inc. ISBN 978-1-848-32749-8.
- Moore, Herbert; Barrett, James W., eds. (1947). Who Killed Hitler?. W. F. Heimlich (foreword). New York: The Booktab Press.
- Musmanno, Michael A. (1950). Ten Days to Die. Garden City, NY: Doubleday.
- O'Donnell, James P. (2001) [1978]. The Bunker. Boston: Da Capo Press. ISBN 978-0-306-80958-3.
- Oltermann, Philip (13 November 2025). "Did Hitler really have a 'micropenis'? The dubious documentary analysing the dictator's DNA". The Guardian.
- Petrova, Ada and Watson, Peter (1995). The Death of Hitler: The Full Story with New Evidence from Secret Russian Archives. W. W. Norton & Company. ISBN 978-0-393-03914-6.
- Rosenberg, Steven (3 September 2009). "I was in Hitler's suicide bunker". BBC News.
- Ryan, Cornelius (1994) [1966]. The Last Battle. New York: Simon & Schuster. ISBN 978-1-439-12701-8.
- Senn, David R. and Weems, Richard A. (2013). Manual of Forensic Odontology. Boca Raton: CRC Press. ISBN 978-1-439-85134-0.
- Shirer, William L. (1960). The Rise and Fall of the Third Reich. New York: Simon & Schuster. LCCN 60-6729.
- Tkachenko, Maxim (11 December 2009). "Official: KGB chief ordered Hitler's remains destroyed". CNN. Archived from the original on 26 September 2024.
- Trevor-Roper, Hugh (2002) [1947]. The Last Days of Hitler (7th ed.). London: Pan Macmillan. ISBN 978-0-330-49060-3.
- US Federal Bureau of Investigation (10 April 2011). "Adolf Hitler". FBI Records: The Vault. Archived from the original on 10 April 2011.
- Vinogradov, V. K.; Pogonyi, J. F.; Teptzov, N. V. (2005). Hitler's Death: Russia's Last Great Secret from the Files of the KGB. London: Chaucer Press. ISBN 978-1-904449-13-3.
