= Kurt Gildisch =

SS officer (1904–1956)

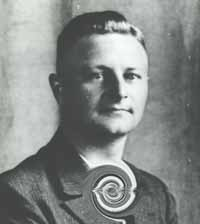
- Born: 2 March 1904; Potrempschen, East Prussia
- Died: 3 March 1956 (aged 52); West Berlin, West Germany
- Military career
- Allegiance: Nazi Germany
- Branch: Schutztaffel
- Rank: SS-Sturmbannführer SS-Untersturmführer der Waffen-SS
- Unit: SS-Begleitkommando des Führers
- Conflicts: World War II

Kurt Gildisch (2 March 1904 – 3 March 1956) was the third commander of Adolf Hitler's personal bodyguard (SS-Begleitkommando des Führers), which he took command of on 11 April 1933. He was a trained teacher, who had failed to find a classroom job and thereafter joined the Prussian police force. Like his successor Bruno Gesche, he was sacked for his Nazi affiliations, and joined the Sturmabteilung (SA) in 1931. Later that year he transferred to the SS. During World War II, Gildisch was wounded and fell into Soviet captivity during the Battle of Berlin. He was released in August 1946. In May 1953, he was convicted in the murder of Dr. Erich Klausener, head of Katholische Aktion (Catholic Action) group, during the "Night of the Long Knives" in 1934. He was sentenced to 15 years in prison and died in 1956.

== Early life ==
Kurt Gildisch was born in Potrempschen (now in Ozyorsky District) in East Prussia, the fourth child of Paul Gildisch and his wife Marie (nee Riel). In his childhood Kurt Gildisch attended primary school in the village of Potrempschen (23 km south west of Insterburg). Subsequently, he was trained as a school teacher. He undertook the schoolteachers test (Lehrerprüfung) in 1924. As he found no opportunities in the teaching profession, he applied for and joined the Prussian police. In October 1925 Gildisch was transferred to Berlin. He was suspended from the police force in 1930 for involvement in Nazi Party activities. He was later dismissed from the police force on 10 March 1931 because of his ties to the Nazi Party.

== SS career ==
He joined the SA on 1 April 1931 and then transferred to the SS on 29 September 1931. On 29 February 1932, Adolf Hitler chose eight from a prospective twelve SS men presented by Sepp Dietrich to serve as his personal bodyguard, the SS-Begleitkommando des Führers. One of the handpicked men was Gildisch. He was viewed with mistrust and dislike by Reichsführer-SS Heinrich Himmler. While nominally under Himmler's control, Gildisch and other close comrades of the Führer took their orders direct from Hitler, much to Himmler's frustration. Gildisch had a heavy drinking problem, which within months of his assuming command of the SS–Begleitkommando from Willy Herzberger, got the better of him.

On 15 June 1934, Himmler had Gildisch removed from his post because of his heavy drinking habits, and replaced by Bruno Gesche as the commander of the SS-Begleitkommando. Hitler did not interfere, but this was not the end of Gildisch's problems. Despite the warning and demotion, Gildisch continued to drink heavily and this led to his expulsion from both the SS and the Nazi Party in 1936. Prior to that, he had been a significant participant in the Night of the Long Knives, which took place from 30 June to 2 July 1934. Gildisch had been ordered by Reinhard Heydrich to Dr. Erich Klausener's office to shoot him. Klausener had been a transportation official in the Prussian Ministry and head of the Katholische Aktion ("Catholic Action") group. After the killing on 30 June, Gildisch was promoted in rank to SS-Sturmbannführer.

== World War II ==
After the war in Europe began, Gildisch joined the Waffen-SS. He participated in a leadership course at the SS-Junkerschule Bad Tölz and on 20 April 1941, he was appointed Untersturmführer der Waffen-SS. From 1942 Gildisch actively fought on the Eastern Front where he "distinguished himself" in combat. In 1944 Gildisch was attached to the 11th SS Volunteer Panzergrenadier Division Nordland. In August 1944 Gildisch was wounded on the Eastern Front. On 2 May 1945 Gildisch was wounded again and taken prisoner by Soviet Red Army troops at the end of the Battle of Berlin.

== Post-war period ==
He was released after the war in August 1946. Upon his return from captivity Gildisch had his right leg amputated and replaced by a prosthesis. Gildisch was for some time incapable of work and due to his personal far-right politics he could seek only limited work options. Kurt Gildisch finally found work after retraining as a bookbinder in an Evangelical-Lutheran maintained company that employed disabled people. In 1949 Gildisch was arrested. After a case at the Berlin court, he was convicted on 18 May 1953 of the murder of Dr. Erich Klausener during the "Night of the Long Knives" in 1934. He was sentenced to 15 years in prison for crimes against humanity. Kurt Gildisch died in 1956 of incurable liver disease in a Wilmersdorfer private hospital after the criminal sentence was suspended due to his poor health and lack of available medical treatment in prison.

== SS career summary ==
- 1 July 1931: SS-Scharführer
- 1 October 1931: SS-Truppführer
- 1 July 1933: SS-Sturmführer
- 1 September 1933: SS-Obersturmführer
- 9 November 1933: SS-Hauptsturmführer
- July 1934: SS-Sturmbannführer
- 1936: Expulsion from the SS
- 1939: Entry into Waffen-SS
- 1941: SS-Oberscharführer der Waffen-SS
- 20 April 1941: SS-Untersturmführer der Waffen-SS
