= Rochus Misch =

German SS non-commissioned officer (1917–2013)

- Misch as an Unterscharführer
- Born: 29 July 1917; Alt Schalkowitz, Kingdom of Prussia
- Died: 5 September 2013 (aged 96); Berlin, Germany
- Spouse: Gerda Misch (m. 1942; died 1998)
- Relatives: 1
- Military career
- Allegiance: Nazi Germany
- Branch: Schutzstaffel
- Service years: 1937–45
- Rank: SS-Oberscharführer
- Units: SS-Verfügungstruppe, Leibstandarte SS Adolf Hitler, Führerbegleitkommando
- Conflicts: World War II: Battle of Modlin
- Awards: Iron Cross; Wound Badge; DRL Sports Badge
- Other work: Home decorating

Rochus Misch (29 July 1917 – 5 September 2013) was a German Oberscharführer (sergeant) in the 1st SS Panzer Division Leibstandarte SS Adolf Hitler (LSSAH). He was badly wounded during the Polish campaign during the first month of World War II in Europe. After recovering, from 1940 to April 1945, he served in the Führerbegleitkommando (Führer Escort Command; FBK) as a bodyguard, courier, and telephone operator for German dictator Adolf Hitler.

Misch was one of the last surviving occupants of the Führerbunker.

== Early life and education ==
Misch was born on 29 July 1917 in Alt-Schalkowitz near Oppeln (Opole) in the Province of Silesia (now Stare Siołkowice, Poland). His father, a construction worker, died of wounds sustained in World War I. His widowed mother died of pneumonia when he was two and a half, and he grew up with his grandparents. His older brother Bruno died following a swimming accident in 1922.

Over the objections of the school director, his grandfather took him out of school after eight years as he thought Rochus needed to learn a trade. After several years, Misch moved to Hoyerswerda and became an apprentice with the firm of Schmüller & Model. There he trained as a painter. In 1935, after working as a journeyman painter, Misch attended the Masters' School for Fine Arts in Cologne. After six months, he returned to Hoyerswerda to continue his training. Misch met Gerda, his wife-to-be, in July 1938. They later married on New Year's Eve, 1942. They had a daughter, Brigitta Jacob-Engelken, who, after the end of World War II, supported Jewish causes.

== Military service ==
In 1937, Misch received a call-up notice for military service. In Offenberg, he joined the SS-Verfügungstruppe (SS-VT), the predecessor to the Waffen-SS, instead of the German Army as the SS-VT did not require Reichsarbeitsdienst (National Labour Service) time. Along with eleven others, he was selected for Hitler's personal bodyguard unit, the Leibstandarte SS Adolf Hitler (LSSAH). In August 1939, he was promoted to the rank of SS-Rottenführer.

=== World War II ===
For the invasion of Poland in September 1939, his regiment was attached to the XIII Army Corps, a part of the 8th Army. Near Warsaw on 24 September, he was one of four men selected by his company commander, then SS-Hauptsturmführer Wilhelm Mohnke, to negotiate the surrender of Polish troops during the Battle of Modlin. He was picked because of his ability, although very limited, to speak Polish. After the negotiations failed, the Germans headed back to their lines. When they were about 80 metres from the fort, firing began. Several rounds struck Misch, who fell down and lost consciousness. Some German soldiers carried him to an aid station. Later, he was transferred to two different hospitals. Thereafter, he spent six weeks at a convalescent home. For his actions, Misch was awarded the Iron Cross, Second Class. As Misch was the last living member of his Lower Silesian family, Mohnke recommended him for the SS-Begleitkommando des Führers (Führer Escort Command; FBK). This was made up of SS members, including men from the LSSAH, who were not serving on the front lines.

Misch was transferred to the FBK in early May 1940. As a junior member of Hitler's permanent bodyguard, Misch travelled with Hitler throughout the war. When not serving as bodyguards, Misch and the others in the unit served as telephone operators, couriers, orderlies, valets, and waiters. When on duty, the FBK members were the only armed men Hitler allowed to be near him. They never had to surrender their weapon and were never searched when they were with Hitler. It did cause Misch some concern that they were armed only with Walther PPK 7.65 pistols.

On 16 January 1945, following the Wehrmacht's defeat in the Battle of the Bulge, Misch and the rest of Hitler's personal staff moved into the Führerbunker and Vorbunker under the Reich Chancellery garden in Berlin. His FBK commanding officer, Franz Schädle, appointed Misch to be the bunker telephone operator. Misch handled all of the direct communication from the bunker. He did not leave it for any significant period of time until the war ended in May 1945. On 22 April 1945, Schädle called him on the phone and told him there was a place reserved for his wife and young daughter on one of the last planes out of Berlin. Misch was temporarily released from duty and drove to pick up his family to take them to the aircraft. However, his wife refused to take their daughter and leave him and her parents in Berlin. Upon returning to the Reich Chancellery, Misch learned Hitler was releasing most of the remaining staff to leave Berlin. By that date, as the Red Army was entering Berlin, propaganda minister Joseph Goebbels and his wife Magda brought their six young children to stay in the Vorbunker. Joseph Goebbels moved into the room next to Misch's telephone exchange in the lower level of the Führerbunker. The Goebbels children would play in the corridor around Misch's post.

On 30 April, the Soviets were less than 500 metres (1,600 ft) from the bunker. That afternoon, Hitler and Eva Braun committed suicide less than 40 hours after they were married. Misch followed Otto Günsche and Hitler's chief valet Heinz Linge to the door of Hitler's private room, but only shared what he briefly observed over 50 years later and in two main versions. In 2005, he stated that he saw Hitler's head facedown on the table and contradicted himself about whether he saw blood; he uniquely claimed that Braun's head was leaning against Hitler's leg. In his 2008 autobiography, he wrote that Braun's head was only "inclined towards Hitler" and he could not recall if there was any blood or if the dictator was sitting on the sofa or the armchair. Further, Hitler's head had only "fallen forward slightly", his eyes "open and staring". Misch started to leave to report the events to Schädle, then stopped and returned to the door of Hitler's study. Misch then observed that Hitler's corpse had been laid on the floor and wrapped in a blanket. Several men then picked it up and carried it past him. Misch left and reported the events to Schädle, who instructed him to return to his duty station. After returning to the telephone exchange, Misch later recalled Unterscharführer Retzbach proclaiming "So they're burning the boss now!" Retzbach asked Misch if he was going upstairs to watch the events, but Misch declined to go. Thereafter, Günsche came down and told Misch that the corpses of Hitler and Braun had been burned in the garden of the Reich Chancellery.

Misch was present in the bunker complex when Magda Goebbels poisoned her six children and then committed suicide with her husband Joseph on 1 May 1945. Misch regarded the murder of the Goebbels children as most unsettling; years later he called it the "most dreadful thing" he experienced in the bunker.

Prior to his suicide, Joseph Goebbels finally released Misch from further service; he was free to leave. Misch and mechanic Johannes Hentschel were two of the last people remaining in the bunker. They exchanged letters to their wives in case anything happened to either of them. Misch then went upstairs through the cellars of the Reich Chancellery to where Schädle had his office to report one last time. According to Hentschel, by that time Schädle's shrapnel leg wound had turned gangrenous. Misch told Schädle that Goebbels had released him. Schädle told Misch what route he should take in order to avoid the Soviet encirclement of the Berlin area. Thereafter, Schädle shot himself. Misch fled the bunker in the early morning of 2 May, only hours before the Red Army seized it. He met up with some other soldiers and travelled north through the U-Bahn tunnels. Shortly thereafter, they were taken prisoner by Red Army soldiers. Misch was brought to Lubyanka Prison in Moscow, where he was tortured by Soviet NKVD officers in an attempt to extract information regarding Hitler's last days. Soviet leader Joseph Stalin was extremely interested in learning of Hitler's fate and theories about possible escape. Misch spent eight years in Soviet forced labour camps.

== Later life and death ==
After his release from captivity, Misch returned to what was then West Berlin on 31 December 1953. At the time, Misch's wife, Gerda, worked as a teacher in Neukölln. Misch struggled for several years with what to do with his life after captivity. He was offered various odd jobs, among others as a porter in a hospital and as a driver. Most of these job offers were through his wartime contacts, and required moving away from Berlin, which his wife refused to do. He finally obtained a loan backed by wealthy German philanthropists to buy a painting and interior decorating shop from a retiree in Berlin. The business had been started by Misch's old friend Adolf Kleinholdermann. In 1975, Gerda was elected to the parliament of West Berlin in which she served for several years. Years later, Gerda developed Alzheimer's and she died in 1998. Misch continued to manage his shop until his retirement in 1986 at the age of 68.

Misch was loyal to Hitler to the end of his life, stating in apologia, "He was no brute. He was no monster. He was no superman. ... He was a wonderful boss. ... Very normal. Not like what is written." Misch's daughter, Brigitta, learned through her maternal grandmother that Gerda was of Jewish descent. However, Gerda never mentioned it and her father refused to acknowledge it. Brigitta became an architect and has supported Jewish causes. She stated that she was disappointed by her father's lack of remorse after the war.

After the release of the 2004 German film Downfall (Der Untergang) in France, French journalist Nicolas Bourcier interviewed Misch on a number of occasions in 2005. The resulting biography was published in French as J'étais garde du corps d'Hitler 1940–1945 ("I was Hitler's bodyguard 1940–1945") in March 2006. Translations were released in South America, Japan, Spain, Poland, Turkey, and Germany in 2006 and 2007. Misch served as consultant to writer Christopher McQuarrie on the 2008 film Valkyrie, a Hollywood depiction of the 20 July plot.

In a 2005 interview, Misch called Downfall "Americanized" while comparing what happened in the film to what happened in real life, stating that although it portrayed the important facts accurately, it exaggerated other details for dramatic effect, such as the film's characters screaming and shouting when in his recollection most people in the bunker spoke quietly. In the interview he also expressed some skepticism regarding Hitler's role in Nazi atrocities. He also opined that "Neo-Nazis" did not exist but were rather just patriotic people, and that the US invaded Iraq in 2003 to enrich Israel.

After listening to an 11-minute recording of Hitler in private conversation with Finnish Field Marshal Carl Gustaf Emil Mannerheim, Misch opined: "He is speaking normally, but I'm having problems with the tone; the intonation isn't quite right. Sometimes it seems okay, but at other points not. I have the feeling it's someone mimicking Hitler. It really sounds as if someone is mimicking him."

Misch's memoir, Der letzte Zeuge ("The Last Witness"), was published in German in 2008 and in English as Hitler's Last Witness in 2014. He lived in Berlin in the same house he moved into when he was released by the Soviets in the district of Rudow in south Berlin. Misch regularly received visitors who wished to speak to or interview him. He died in Berlin on 5 September 2013, aged 96, and was the last surviving member of Hitler's entourage in the Führerbunker. The last survivor of the bunker itself was nurse Johanna Ruf, who was 15 years old in 1945 and died in mid-2023. The Independent reported that Misch had been the first to see Hitler's body, although Günsche and Linge were with him.

== Books ==
- J'étais garde du corps d'Hitler 1940–1945 (I was Hitler's bodyguard 1940–1945), with Nicolas Bourcier. Le Cherche Midi 2006, ISBN 978-2749105055.
- Rochus Misch: Der letzte Zeuge. Ich war Hitlers Telefonist, Kurier und Leibwächter. Mit einem Vorwort von Ralph Giordano. 11. Auflage, Piper-Verlag 2013, ISBN 978-3-492-25735-0.
- Hitler's Last Witness: The Memoirs of Hitler's Bodyguard. Frontline Books 2014, ISBN 978-1848327498. Introduction by Roger Moorhouse.

== See also ==
- The Bunker
- Downfall (Der Untergang)
- Die Letzte Schlacht (The Last Battle)
