= Bruno Gesche =

German SS officer (1905–1982)

- Born: 5 November 1905; Berlin, Germany
- Died: 1982; West Germany
- Military career
- Allegiance: Nazi Germany (1933–1945)
- Branch: Schutzstaffel (SS)
- Rank: Obersturmbannführer*
- Units: SS-Begleitkommando des Führers, 5th SS Panzer Division Wiking, 16th SS Panzergrenadier Division Reichsführer-SS
- Conflicts: World War II, Eastern Front

Bruno Gesche (5 November 1905 – 7 August 1982) rose to the rank of Obersturmbannführer (lieutenant colonel equivalent) in the SS in Nazi Germany. He was a member of Adolf Hitler's entourage and the fourth commander of Hitler's personal bodyguard (originally known as the SS-Begleitkommando des Führers, later known as Führerbegleitkommando) for the periods June 1934 – April 1942 and December 1942 – December 1944.

== Early career ==
Gesche's aspirations for a career in the German military as an officer were effectively ended by the limitations imposed by the Treaty of Versailles on the post-First World War national defence force, the Reichswehr and his limited education. Gesche joined what was then a fringe political movement, the NSDAP (Nazi Party), and its paramilitary wing, the Sturmabteilung (SA) in 1922. Although Gesche's association with the Nazi movement cost him his job at a bank in 1923, his status within the Nazi Party as an Alte Kämpfer (NSDAP Member No. 8592) proved to be a tremendous asset to him during the better part of the subsequent two and a half decades. In 1927, Gesche left the SA to join what was then its subordinate branch, the Schutzstaffel (SS Member No. 1093). The SS, as in its earlier incarnations, the Stabswache and Stoßtrupp-Hitler, functioned as Adolf Hitler's bodyguard unit.

== SS-Begleitkommando des Führers ==
On 29 February 1932, with the advice of Reichsführer-SS Heinrich Himmler, Hitler chose eight from a prospective twelve SS men presented by Sepp Dietrich, to serve as his personal bodyguard, the SS-Begleitkommando des Führers. One of the handpicked men was Bruno Gesche. Not long after the unit's creation, Gesche managed to draw the ire of Himmler To Himmler's consternation, Hitler's fondness for Gesche stemming from their days as old guard comrades would define Gesche's fate for practically the duration of Nazi Germany.

=== Conflicts with Himmler ===
The first incident arose when Gesche levied criticism against Himmler for the security detail provided by another SS unit during a Hitler campaign speech in Selb on 14 October 1932. Himmler regarded this as a personal affront. Both Himmler and the SS Group Commander South demanded that Gesche be demoted and removed from the SS-Begleitkommando. However, Hitler ordered that Gesche receive only a reprimand.

Himmler did succeed in having Gesche's immediate superior, the third commander of the SS-Begleitkommando, Kurt Gildisch, dismissed in 1934. Eventually, Gildisch was dismissed from the SS, as well as the Nazi Party in 1936, for repeated instances of drunkenness. Gesche, as second-in-command, succeeded Gildisch as commander of the SS-Begleitkommando in June 1934. The unit was later expanded and became known as the Führerbegleitkommando (Führer Escort Command; FBK).

On another occasion in 1935, Himmler ordered that the salaries of Hitler's personal bodyguard detail be suspended, which he did as part of his attempts at consolidating his authority. Gesche responded by enlisting the help of the commander of Hitler's personal bodyguard regiment, Leibstandarte SS Adolf Hitler, Sepp Dietrich, who managed to have Himmler's order reversed.

Seizing on Gesche's frequent bouts of intoxication, Himmler enforced the 1937 SS requirement forbidding members from consuming alcohol in excess of certain mandated limits. After obtaining evidence that Gesche was in violation of the mandate, Himmler had him sign a statement on 26 September 1938, promising to abstain from alcohol consumption for three years or else face expulsion from the SS. After a few months, Himmler lifted the ban. Hitler's fondness for Gesche had again forced Himmler's hand.

=== War years ===
In early 1942, after another session of heavy drinking, Gesche pulled his pistol and threatened a fellow SS officer. After Himmler was informed of these events, even Gesche's close relationship with Hitler could not save him from Himmler's wrath. Gesche was dismissed from his command of the Führerbegleitkommando and again required to abstain from drinking for three years. Gesche was transferred to the Eastern Front and the Waffen-SS, 5th SS Panzer Division Wiking. He served with 1./SS-Panzer-Jäger-Abteilung 5. The 5th SS, from the moment Gesche arrived in the summer of 1942, engaged in bitter battles with Soviet forces for control of the oil-rich Caucasus. Before the collapse of the German 6th Army at Stalingrad, and the retreat through the Caucasus by the remnants that had not surrendered, Gesche had been evacuated from the front after being wounded in combat in October 1942. Gesche was awarded the Iron Cross 2nd Class and Wound Badge in black. Hitler was very pleased with Gesche's performance, and by December 1942, he was reinstated as commander of the Führerbegleitkommando. Hitler decreed that no man who had served in Hitler's HQ should be sent to the Eastern Front, for fear of capture and interrogation by the Soviets as to security information.

In December 1944, Gesche's time as commander of the Führerbegleitkommando came to an end. In his strongly worded rebuke, soon after an incident that featured a drunken Gesche firing shots at a comrade, Himmler wrote in part:

— "...I became aware in 1938, as well as through reports in recent years and months that you are a drunkard without any self control...I reduce you in rank to a SS-Unterscharführer. Only as an act of clemency...I allow you to remain a member. I shall give you the opportunity to serve in the Dirlewanger Brigade and perhaps wipe out the shame...by proving yourself before the enemy. I expect you to refrain from the consumption of alcohol for the rest of your life... If your will power has been so destroyed by alcohol that you are not capable of making such a decision, I expect you to submit your resignation..."

After Gesche was reduced by nine grades in rank from a SS-Obersturmbannführer to SS-Unterscharführer, Franz Schädle was promoted to be the next commander of the FBK. Gesche's assignment to the notorious SS penal unit, Dirlewanger, at that stage of the war, was for all practical purposes a death sentence. Although Hitler did not personally intervene on Gesche's behalf, other allies in the SS did so. SS-Gruppenführer Hermann Fegelein and SS-Obergruppenführer Maximilian von Herff successfully argued that assignment to the Dirlewanger Brigade, which was then operating on the Eastern Front, would be in contravention to the Hitler order forbidding such deployments. Although Gesche was spared certain death with the Dirlewanger unit, he never again rejoined the Führerbegleitkommando. He was instead assigned to the 16th SS Panzergrenadier Division Reichsführer-SS, 5./SS-Panzer-Grenadier-Regiment 35, ultimately surrendering to the Americans in Italy in 1945. According to records housed at the Deutsche Dienststelle (WASt), Bruno Gesche's last date of internment by the Western Allies was 22 March 1947.

== Promotions, demotions and decorations ==
Promotions and demotion

- 20.7.31 – SS-Untersturmführer (2nd lieutenant)
- 9.11.33 – SS-Obersturmführer (1st lieutenant)
- 1.7.34 – SS-Hauptsturmführer (captain)
- 20.4.35 – SS-Sturmbannführer (major)
- 9.11.44 – SS-Obersturmbannführer (lieutenant colonel)
- 20.12.44 – SS-Unterscharführer (sergeant) (demoted by Himmler)*

Decorations and awards

- Golden Party Badge
- Totenkopfring
- Wound Badge in Black
- Iron Cross 2nd Class

== See also ==
- List of SS personnel
- Uniforms and insignia of the Schutzstaffel
