= Franz Schädle =

SS officer (1906–1945)

- Born: 19 November 1906; Westerheim, Kingdom of Württemberg, German Empire
- Died: 2 May 1945 (aged 38); Berlin, Nazi Germany
- Military career
- Allegiance: Nazi Germany
- Branch: Schutzstaffel
- Service years: 1930–1945
- Rank: SS-Obersturmbannführer
- Service number: 2605
- Unit: SS-Begleitkommando des Führers
- Commands: Führerbegleitkommando (1945)
- Conflicts: Battle of Berlin

Franz Schädle (19 November 1906 – 2 May 1945) was the last commander of Adolf Hitler's personal bodyguard (the Führerbegleitkommando; FBK), from 5 January 1945 until his death on 2 May 1945.

== Biography ==
Schädle was born in Westernheim, Kingdom of Württemberg and after trade school he worked as a construction technician. He joined the SS on 1 February 1930. On 29 February 1932, the SS-Begleitkommando was formed to provide general protection for Hitler. Schädle was one of twelve SS members selected by Sepp Dietrich to present to Hitler for the unit. From the twelve, a smaller eight-man team called the SS-Begleitkommando des Führers (SS Escort Command of the Führer; SS-BKdF) was chosen to protect Hitler as he travelled outside Munich and the borders of Bavaria, Germany. As a member of the unit, Schädle guarded Hitler at the various Führer Headquarters and accompanied him on all his trips. He also served on the staff of Reichsführer-SS Heinrich Himmler from 1 May 1934.

On 5 January 1945, Schädle was appointed commander of the bodyguard unit after the dismissal of Bruno Gesche. By then, the SS-Begleitkommando had been expanded and was known as the Führerbegleitkommando (Führer Escort Command; FBK). He accompanied Hitler and his entourage into the bunker complex under the Reich Chancellery garden in the central government sector of Berlin. Schädle appointed FBK member Oberscharführer Rochus Misch to be the bunker telephone operator. By 23 April 1945, Schädle commanded approximately 30 members in the unit who stood guard for Hitler. On 28 April 1945, Schädle was wounded in the leg by shrapnel, which caused him to have to "hobble" around using a crutch.

After Hitler committed suicide on the afternoon of 30 April, Schädle was present at Hitler's cremation in the garden of the Reich Chancellery. Thereafter, orders were issued that those who could do so were to break out. The plan was to escape from Berlin to surrender to the Western Allies on the Elbe or join the German Army to the North. Those left in the Reich Chancellery and Führerbunker were split up into ten main groups. Rochus Misch stated that Schädle had ordered, that when the time came, he was to join SS-Brigadeführer Wilhelm Mohnke's lead break-out group. Misch later recalled that shortly thereafter, four fellow FBK guards came down into the Führerbunker carrying an empty stretcher. They wanted to carry Schädle on it during the break-out. Schädle turned them down. According to the bunker's master electro-mechanic Johannes Hentschel, by that time Schädle's leg wound had become gangrenous.

Prior to his suicide, Joseph Goebbels finally released Misch from further service as the bunker telephone operator; he was free to leave. By then, Misch and mechanic Hentschel were two of the last people remaining in the bunker. Misch went upstairs, through the cellars of the Reich Chancellery to where Schädle had his office to report one last time. Misch told Schädle that Goebbels had released him. Schädle told Misch of the route he should take to try to get through the Soviet encirclement of the area. Thereafter, Schädle committed suicide by shooting himself in the mouth with a pistol, rather than attempt the breakout from the Chancellery to escape from the advancing Red Army. He did not want to endanger the lives of the others in the attempt, given the fact he could only walk at a slow pace using a crutch.
