= Sister organization =

Organization which is dependent upon another organization

A sister organization is an agency or body which is nearly or completely dependent upon another organization to exist. Sister organizations may exist in several different fields from business, government, law enforcement, and within the military.

Historically, the secret police agencies of Nazi Germany were considered sister organizations to each other, in that the Gestapo and Sicherheitsdienst were almost entirely integrated with each other. In many cases, SS officers would hold dual posts in both organizations simultaneously especially at the higher levels.

Within government legislation, law-making bodies with an "upper" and "lower" house are considered to be sister organizations. Such is the case with the United States Senate and House of Representatives which are considered law making sister organizations of each other.
