= SS-Begleitkommando des Führers =

SS bodyguard unit for Adolf Hitler

SS Escort Command of the Führer
- SS-Begleitkommando des Führers l/k/a Führerbegleitkommando
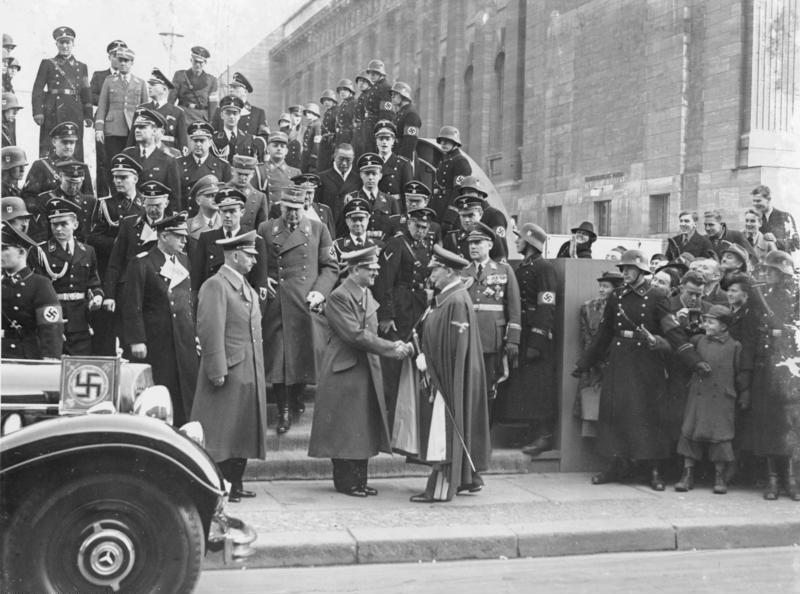
- Führerbegleitkommando and other uniformed SS men providing security for Hitler in February 1939
- Active: 29 February 1932 – 30 April 1945
- Country: Nazi Germany
- Allegiance: Axis
- Branch: Schutzstaffel
- Role: Bodyguards

SS-Begleitkommando des Führers ("SS Escort Command of the Führer"; SS-BKdF), later known as the Führerbegleitkommando ("Führer Escort Command"; FBK), was originally an eight-man SS squad formed from a twelve-man security squad (known as the SS-Begleitkommando) tasked with protecting the life of Adolf Hitler during the early 1930s. Another bodyguard unit, the Reichssicherheitsdienst (Reich Security Service; RSD) was formed in 1933, and by the following year replaced the FBK in providing Hitler's overall security throughout Germany. The FBK continued under separate command from the RSD and provided close, personal security for Hitler. The two units worked together for Hitler's security and protection, especially during trips and public events, though they operated at such events as separate groups and used separate vehicles. When the FBK unit was expanded, the additional officers and men were selected from the Leibstandarte SS Adolf Hitler (LSSAH). The majority of these additional men were used by Hitler as guards for his residences while uninhabited and as orderlies, valets, waiters, and couriers.

The FBK accompanied Hitler on all his travels and was always present at the different Führerhauptquartiere (Führer Headquarters; FHQ) throughout World War II. When on duty, the FBK members were the only armed personnel Hitler allowed to be near him. The unit remained responsible for Hitler's personal protection until his suicide in Berlin on 30 April 1945.

== Service history ==
The SS-Begleitkommando was formed on 29 February 1932 to provide general protection to Hitler and other Nazi Party functionaries. Twelve Schutzstaffel (SS) members were selected by Sepp Dietrich to present to Hitler. From the twelve, a smaller eight-man team called the SS-Begleitkommando des Führers was chosen to protect Hitler as he travelled around Germany. Their first appearance was when they accompanied Hitler during the election campaign trips in 1932. They served around the clock protecting Hitler.

Formed in March 1933, the Führerschutzkommando (FSK) replaced the SS-Begleitkommando for Hitler's overall protection throughout Germany in the spring of 1934. The FSK members consisted of criminal-police detectives of the Bavarian police. The small SS-Begleitkommando des Führers unit continued to provide personal security for Hitler. The FSK was also responsible for general security measures, preventive measures, and prosecution of assassination attempts. The Führerschutzkommando was officially renamed the Reichssicherheitsdienst (Reich Security Service; RSD) on 1 August 1935. The RSD and the SS-Begleitkommando cooperated with the Ordnungspolizei (uniformed order police), Gestapo, and other agencies to provide the inner security requirements, whereas outer protection was handled by general SS units.

=== Expansion and renamed ===
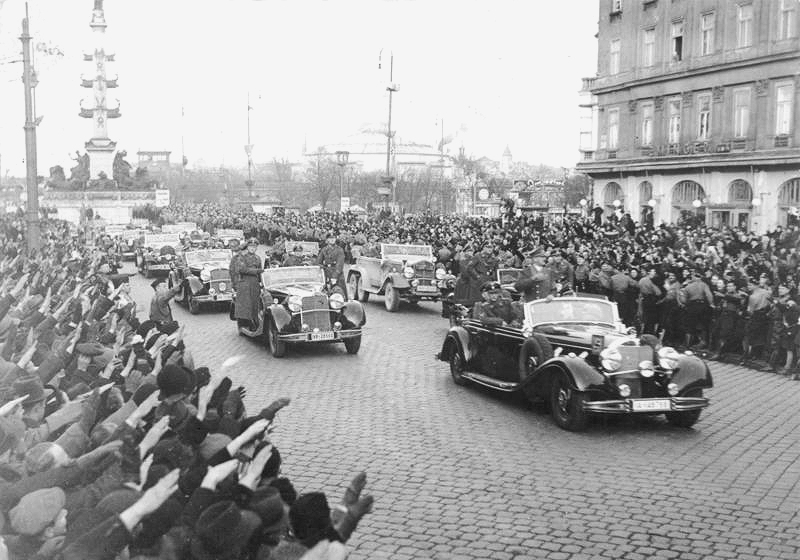
Hitler's motorcade with FBK and RSD escort cars to the left and right behind his car, as they head towards the city center of Vienna in 1938

The SS-Begleitkommando was expanded and became known as the Führerbegleitkommando (Führer Escort Command; FBK). By 1937, the unit had grown to 37 members. The FBK continued under separate command and provided close, personal security for Hitler. Additional members for the FBK were drawn from the Leibstandarte SS Adolf Hitler (LSSAH). Hitler used them for guard duty, but also as orderlies, valets, waiters, and couriers. While nominally under the control of Reichsführer-SS Heinrich Himmler, the FBK took their orders direct from Hitler, much to Himmler's frustration. For administrative purposes, the FBK was under the control of the LSSAH. That did not change the fact the unit received their orders from Hitler and in later years from his chief adjutant, Julius Schaub, through the day-to-day operational orders given to Johann Rattenhuber, chief of the RSD.

When on duty, the FBK members were the only armed personnel Hitler allowed to be near him. They never had to surrender their Walther PPK 7.65 pistols and were never searched when they were with Hitler. On the other hand, the RSD men were required to remain at positions some distance away from Hitler.

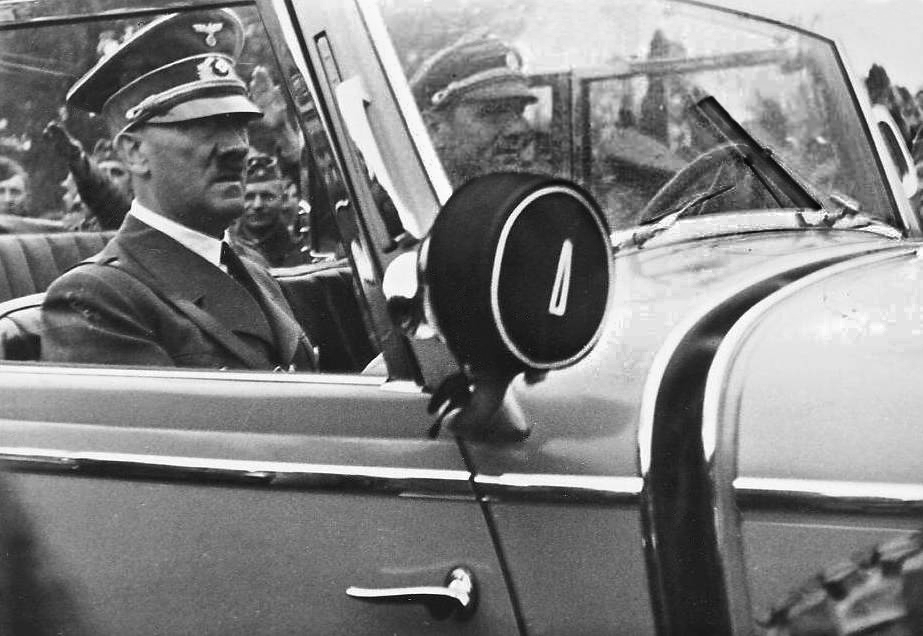
Hitler and his FBK driver Erich Kempka in Mercedes W31 – September 1939, Poland

The FBK and RSD worked together for security and protection during trips and public events, but they operated as two groups and used separate vehicles. RSD chief Rattenhuber was in overall command and the FBK chief acted as his deputy. His FBK chauffeur Erich Kempka usually drove one of Hitler's black Mercedes-Benz cars from a fleet of six to eight that were stationed in Berlin, Munich and other places. Unless in the company of an important person, Hitler would sit in the front seat next to Kempka, with an adjutant behind him. When travelling in motorcades, following Hitler's Mercedes would be two cars to the left and right, one with FBK men and the other with a detachment of RSD men. In July 1938, upon Kempka's directive a fully armor-plated Mercedes was built and delivered in time for Hitler's 50th birthday of 20 April 1939. The car had 18 mm steel plate and 40 mm bullet-proof glass.

By March 1938, both the FBK and RSD wore the standard field grey uniform of the SS as both units were made up of SS members. Guarding Hitler could require very long days, especially for the FBK members, who at times were on duty for twenty-four hours without rest. However, the RSD members as trained criminal-police detectives tended to consider themselves a more disciplined group.

The FBK accompanied Hitler on all his travels and was always present at the different Führerhauptquartiere (Führer Headquarters; FHQ) in various parts of occupied Europe during World War II. Wherever Hitler was in residence, members of the FBK and RSD were present. The FBK provided close security protection and would also be posted as guards in corridors leading to Hitler's office in places such as the Reich Chancellery. The RSD men patrolled the grounds. For special events, the number of LSSAH guards, who provided an outer ring of protection was increased. By 15 January 1943 the FBK had expanded to 31 SS officers and 112 men. Thirty-three were used for escort duties, rotating in groups of eleven. The rest were used as guards for Hitler's residences "not in use at the time" and other duties.

=== Wolf's Lair FHQ ===
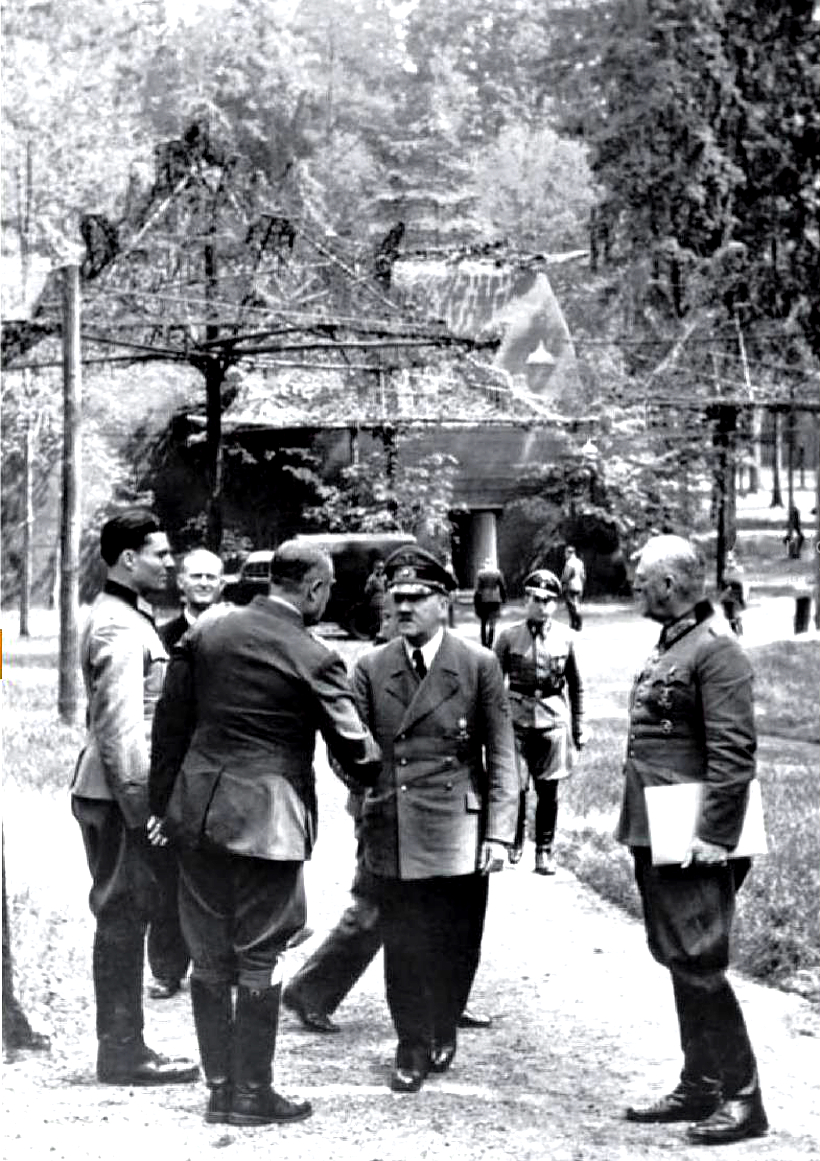
Claus von Stauffenberg (far left) meeting Hitler at the Wolf's Lair in July 1944

As RSD chief, Rattenhuber was responsible for securing Hitler's field headquarters. Hitler's most famous military FHQ during the war was the Wolf's Lair (Wolfsschanze). He spent more time at that Eastern Front military field headquarters than any other. Hitler first arrived at the headquarters in June 1941. In total, he spent more than 800 days there during a three-and-a-half-year period until his final departure on 20 November 1944. It was guarded by personnel from the RSD, and Führerbegleitbrigade (FBB). The FBK men were also present when Hitler was there. It had several security zones. Sperrkreis 1 (Security Zone 1) was located at the heart of the Wolf's Lair. Ringed by steel fencing and guarded by RSD and FBK men, it contained Hitler's bunker and ten other camouflaged bunkers built from 2-metre (6 ft 7 in) thick steel-reinforced concrete. Sperrkreis 2 (Security Zone 2) surrounded the inner zone. This area housed the quarters of several Reich ministers, the HQ personnel, two messes, a communication centre, as well as the military barracks for the FBB. Sperrkreis 3 (Security Zone 3) was a heavily fortified outer security area which surrounded the two inner zones. It was defended by land mines and FBB personnel, who manned guardhouses, watchtowers and checkpoints. Despite the security, the most notable assassination attempt against Hitler was made at the Wolf's Lair on 20 July 1944. No plots or assassination attempts ever originated with or included members of the FBK or RSD. The original FBK members were old Nazi Party comrades of Hitler and all the men chosen were loyal to him.

== 1945 ==
After the dismissal of Bruno Gesche in December 1944, SS-Obersturmbannführer Franz Schädle was appointed the last FBK commander on 5 January 1945. Himmler wrote a strongly worded rebuke, after an incident that featured a drunken Gesche firing shots at a comrade. Gesche was reduced nine grades in rank and transferred to the Waffen-SS.

On 16 January 1945, following the failure of the Battle of the Bulge, Schädle accompanied Hitler and his entourage into the bunker complex under the Reich Chancellery garden in the central government sector of Berlin. The FBK and the rest of Hitler's personal staff moved into the Vorbunker and Führerbunker. The main entry into the Führerbunker was from a stairway built at right angles leading down from the Vorbunker. After descending the stairs into the lower section, RSD and FBK men were positioned in a guard room to check identity cards and briefcases, before personnel were allowed to pass into the corridor of the Führerbunker proper. The FBK and RSD men were on duty in twelve-hour shifts. By 23 April 1945, Schädle commanded approximately 30 members of the FBK unit who stood guard for Hitler until his suicide on 30 April 1945. During that time, most of the remaining FBK and RSD men had been withdrawn from the "exposed sentry posts" on the Chancellery roof and outside the Führerbunker entrances due to the shelling of the area by Soviet Red Army artillery.

After Hitler's death, a briefing conference was held where prior orders were implemented that those who could do so were to break out from the centre government sector and join other German formations. The plan was to escape from Berlin to surrender to the Western Allies on the Elbe or join the German Army to the north. Schädle did not join one of the break out groups, which included FBK and RSD members. According to the bunker's master electro-mechanic Johannes Hentschel, by that time Schädle's shrapnel leg wound had become gangrenous. He could only walk at a slow pace using a crutch. Schädle committed suicide by shooting himself in the mouth with a pistol, rather than attempt the break out from the surrounded Reich Chancellery area.

== Original members ==
- Bodo Gelzenleuchter
- Willy Herzberger
- Kurt Gildisch
- Bruno Gesche
- Franz Schädle
- Erich Kempka
- August Körber
- Adolf Dirr
- Paul Reinyard

== Commanders ==
RSD Commander:

- Johann Rattenhuber (1933–1945)

SS-Begleitkommando (later known as: FBK) commanders:

- Bodo Gelzenleuchter: March 1932 to later that same year
- Willy Herzberger: Later part of 1932 – 11 April 1933
- Kurt Gildisch: 11 April 1933 – 15 June 1934
- Bruno Gesche: 15 June 1934 – April 1942 and December 1942 – December 1944
- Franz Schädle: January – April 1945

== Notable FBK members ==
- Ewald Lindloff
- Fritz Darges
- Hans Hermann Junge
- Heinz Linge
- Karl Wilhelm Krause
- Max Wünsche
- Otto Günsche
- Richard Schulze-Kossens – deputy commander of FBK, December 1942
- Rochus Misch

== See also ==
- Adolf Hitler's bodyguard
