= Führer Headquarters =

Administrative centers used by Nazi leaders throughout World War II

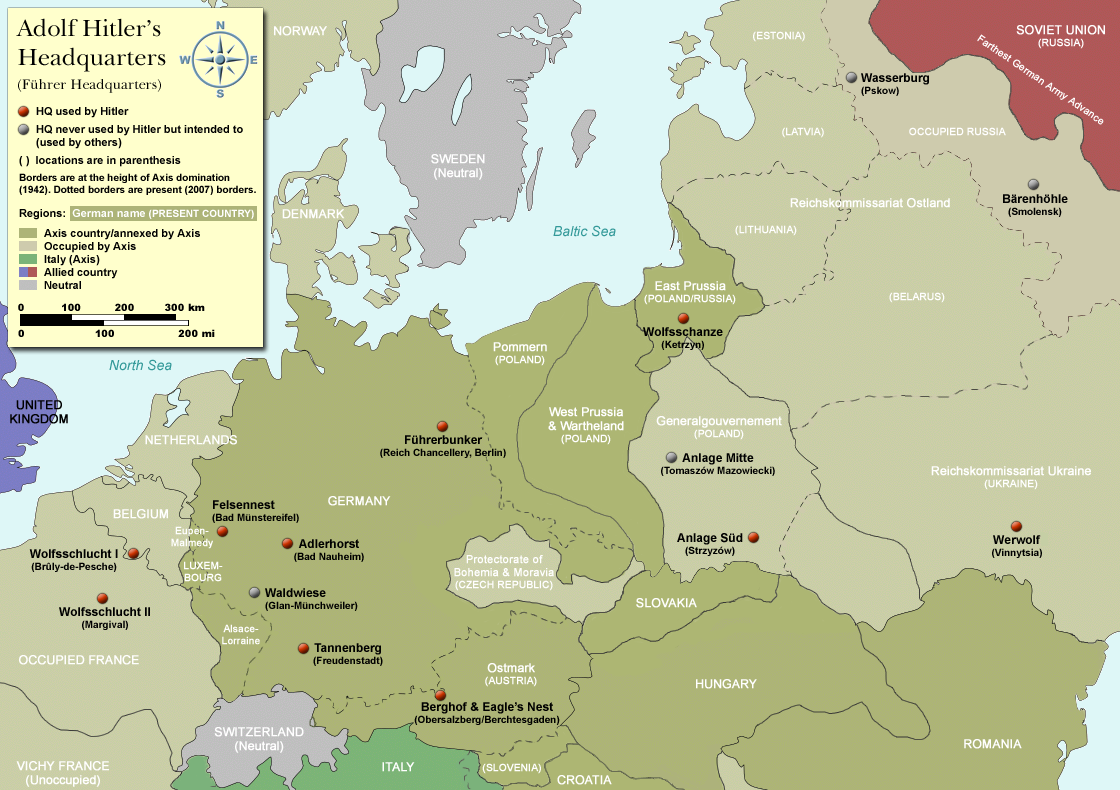
Map showing the locations of the Führer Headquarters throughout Europe

The Führer Headquarters (German: Führerhauptquartiere), abbreviated FHQ, were a number of official headquarters used by the Nazi leader Adolf Hitler and various other German commanders and officials throughout Europe during World War II. The last one to be used, and the most widely known, was the Führerbunker in Berlin, where Hitler committed suicide on 30 April 1945. Other notable headquarters are the Wolfsschanze (Wolf's Lair) in East Prussia, where Claus Graf von Stauffenberg in league with other conspirators attempted to assassinate Hitler on 20 July 1944, and Hitler's private home, the Berghof, at Obersalzberg near Berchtesgaden, where he frequently met with prominent foreign and domestic officials.

== Introduction ==
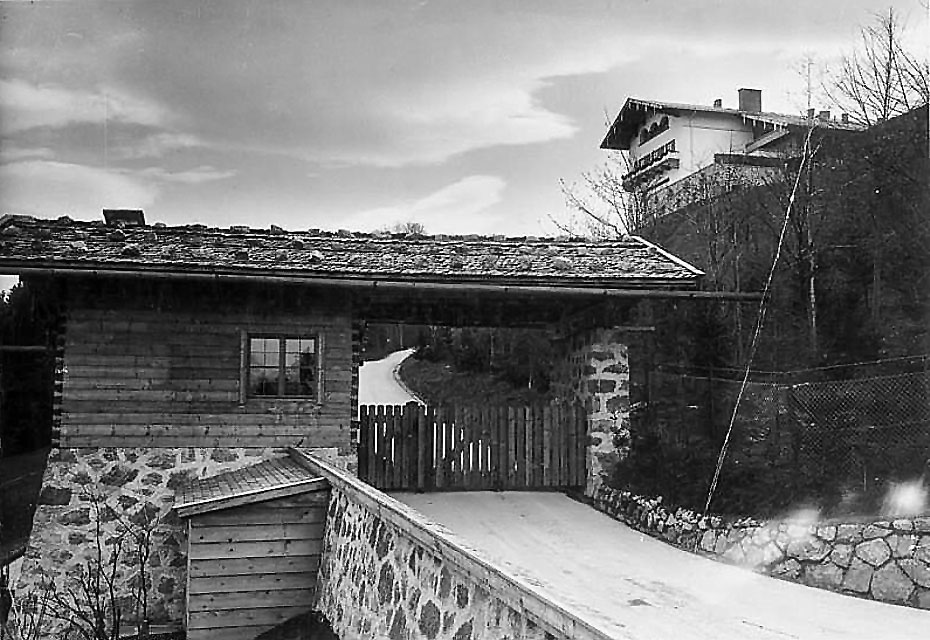
The Berghof, Hitler's home near Berchtesgaden, became part of the Obersalzberg military complex. Other than the Wolfsschanze in East Prussia, Hitler spent more time at the Berghof than anywhere else during World War II.

At the beginning of World War II there were no permanent headquarters constructed for Hitler. The German leader would visit the frontlines using either aeroplanes or his special train, the Führersonderzug; which could be considered as the first of his field headquarters. The first permanent Führer Headquarters was the Felsennest, used by Hitler during the Battle of France in May 1940. Hitler spent little time in Berlin during the war, and the dwellings he most frequently used were the Berghof and the Wolfsschanze, spending more than 800 days at the latter.

The Führer Headquarters were especially designed to work as command facilities for the Führer, which meant all necessary demands were taken into consideration: communications, conference rooms, safety measures, bunkers, guard facilities, etc. The Berghof and the Obersalzberg complex were modified and extended with considerable defense facilities (bunkers, guard posts etc.). The Wehrmachtbericht, a daily propaganda broadcast covering the war, was transmitted from the Führer Headquarters.

The Fuhrerhauptquartiere programme used over one million cubic metres (35 million cu ft) of concrete, more than half at Anlage Riese and Wolfsschlucht II. Forced labourers worked for nearly 12 million working days—two-thirds at Anlage Riese, Wolfsschlucht II, and Wolfsschanze.

The Führer Headquarters cannot be considered as strict military headquarters; the Wehrmacht had their own, distinctly located in other places, yet often in the vicinity of the FHQs. Nevertheless, because Hitler directly controlled much of the German war effort, the FHQs more often than not became de facto military headquarters. In reality, Nazi Germany's military command during the war generally rested upon Hitler's directives, while the rest of the military command structure, especially the Oberkommando der Wehrmacht (OKW) (directly controlled by Hitler) was reduced to executing his decisions, as compared to most other nations' command structures, which generally had more independence in decision-making.

=== Terminology ===
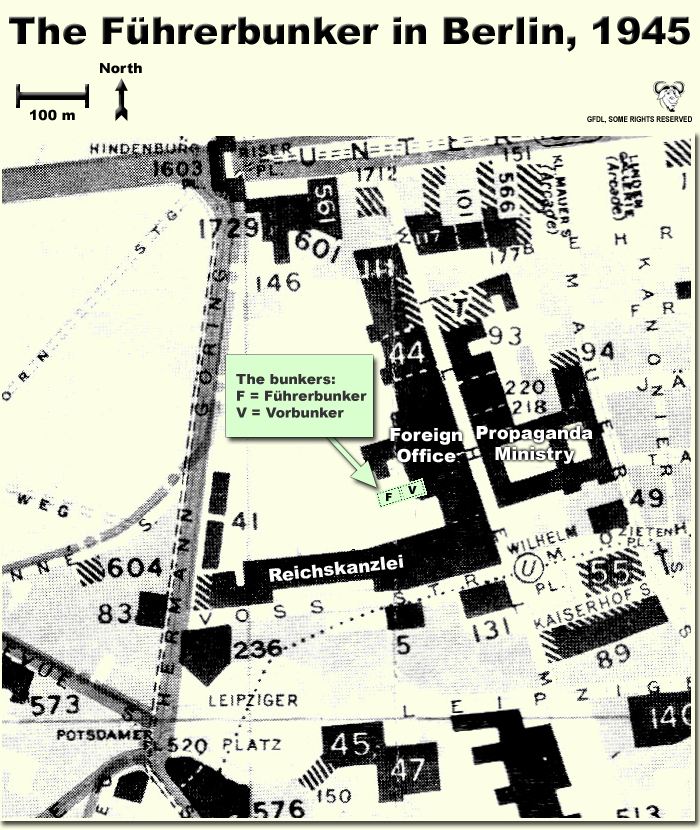
The location of the Führerbunker and Vorbunker in Berlin, 1945

Every place Hitler stayed cannot be considered as a Führer Headquarters, and he did not stay at every official FHQ. Furthermore, some sources may not refer to the Berghof and the Führerbunker as official German Führerhauptquartiere at that time in history, but both of them became de facto Führer Headquarters; thus, they are historically often referred to as such.

The Berghof was modified in much the same way as other FHQs, and Hitler had daily conferences on military matters there in the latter part of the war. The "Eagle's Nest", i.e. the Kehlsteinhaus, was rarely used and may not be considered a FHQ as such alone; however, it was associated with the Berghof and part of the Obersalzberg military complex.

The Führerbunker was located about 8.5 metres (28 ft) beneath the garden of the old Reich Chancellery at Wilhelmstraße 77, and 120 metres (390 ft) north of the new Reich Chancellery building at Voßstraße 6 in Berlin. It became a de facto Führer Headquarters during the Battle of Berlin, and ultimately, the last of his headquarters.

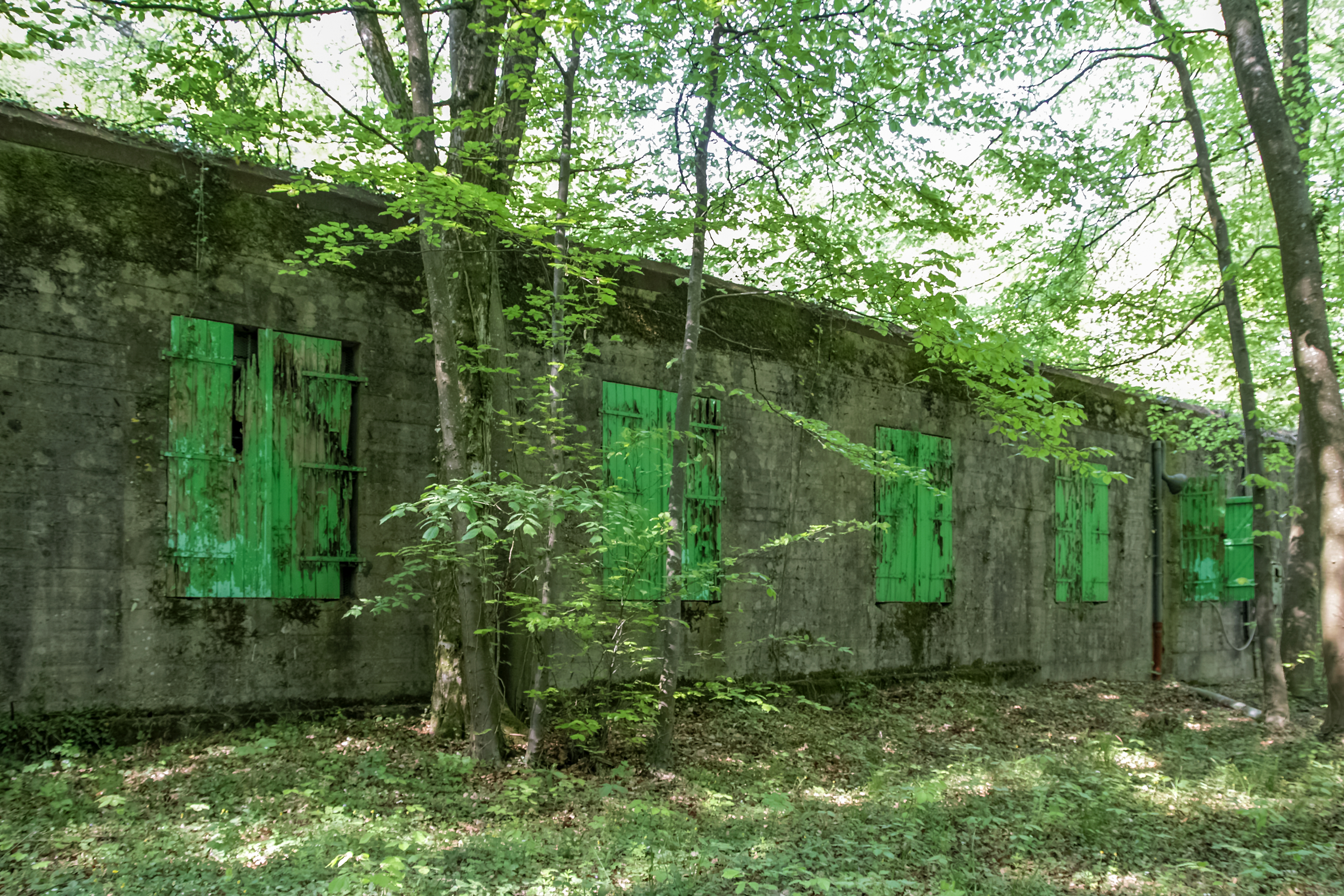
Brunhilde near Angevillers in France seen in 2011

== Headquarters locations ==
There were about 14 known completed Führer Headquarters (of about 20 planned):

| Name | Alternative designations | Location | Build started | Completed | Usage as Führer Headquarters |
|---|---|---|---|---|---|
| Adlerhorst(Eagle's Nest) | Mühle (OT); Bauvorhaben Z Lager K Bauvorhaben C | Bad Nauheim, Hesse | 1 Sep 1939 | yes | yes – used by Hitler during the Ardennes offensive; was too late for invasion of Poland, and Hitler told Speer it was "too luxurious ... the Führer must show Spartan simplicity". |
| Anlage Mitte(Central Facility) | Askania Mitte | Tomaszów Mazowiecki, Masovia, Poland | 1 Dec 1940 | yes | no – only industry |
| Anlage Riese(Riese Facility) | none | Wałbrzych (Waldenburg), Lower Silesia | Oct 1943 | no | no |
| Anlage Süd(Southern Facility) | Askania Süd | Strzyżów (Strezow), Lesser Poland | 1 Oct 1940 | yes | yes, Hitler met with Mussolini here on 27–28 August 1941 |
| Berghof(Mountain Court) | none | Obersalzberg, Berchtesgaden, Bavaria | ? | yes | yes – also thought by the Allies to be within an Alpine Fortress "last stand" territory of the Third Reich |
| Bärenhöhle(Bear's Lair) | none | Smolensk, Russia; Platform of Gniesdovo station lengthened for Führersonderzug | 1 Oct 1941 | yes | no – used by Army Group Centre |
| Felsennest(Rocky Nest) | none | Rodert, Bad Münstereifel, Rhineland | 1940 | yes | yes, used by Hitler during the Battle of France in May, 1940 |
| Frühlingssturm (Spring Storm) | none | Mönichkirchen, Lower Austria | 12 April 1941 | yes | yes. Trains Amerika and Atlas, and Mönichkirchen goods station, for invasion of Yugoslavia, until 27 April 1941 |
| Führerbunker(Leader's Bunker) | none | Berlin | 1943 | yes | yes, Hitler committed suicide here in 1945 |
| Führersonderzug(Leader's Special Train) | (a special train) "Amerika", "Brandenburg" | various (movable) | 1939? | yes | yes |
| Olga | none | Orsha, Belarus | 1 July 1943 | no | no |
| S III | Wolfsturm, Olga etc. | Ohrdruf, Thuringia | Autumn 1944 (?) | no | no |
| Siegfried | Hagen | Pullach, Bavaria | ? | ? | no |
| Tannenberg | none | Freudenstadt/Kniebis, Germany | 1 Oct 1939 | yes | yes (27 June – 5 July 1940) |
| W3 | Wolfsschlucht III | Saint-Rimay, Loire Valley, France | 1 May 1942 | no. | no. Built around a railway tunnel with armoured doors to protect the Führersonderzug, with bunkers for Hitler and for his staff at northeast entrance. Had anti-aircraft emplacements. |
| Waldwiese(Forest Meadow) | none | Glan-Münchweiler, Palatinate | 1 Oct 1939 | yes | no |
| Wasserburg(Water Mountain) | none | Pskov (Pleskau), Russia | 1 Nov 1942 | yes | no (assigned to Army Group North) |
| Werwolf(Werewolf) | Eichenhain | Vinnytsia, Ukraine | 1 Nov 1941 | yes | yes, on 28 December 1943 Hitler ordered its demolition after failure of Operation Citadel |
| Wolfsschanze(Wolf's Redoubt) | Askania Nord, "Wolf's Lair" | Kętrzyn (Rastenburg), Masuria, Poland | 1 Dec 1940 | yes | yes, site of the failed 20 July plot on Hitler's life |
| Wolfsschlucht I(Wolf's Canyon I) | | Brûly-de-Pesche, near to Couvin, Belgium | 1 May 1940 | yes | yes. A further bunker planned near the Wolfspalast (formerly the village inn) was not completed. |
| Wolfsschlucht II(Wolf's Canyon II) | W2, later Zucarello | Margival, Picardy, France | 1 Sep 1942 | yes | yes. Built around a railway tunnel with armoured doors to protect the Führersonderzug. The compound had six large bunkers; an OKW bunker was adjacent to the Führerbunker, also signals and guest bunkers and anti-aircraft emplacements. |
| Zigeuner (Gypsy) | Brunhilde | Thionville, Moselle, France; used Maginot Line tunnels | 1 Apr 1944 | no | no |

== Special train (Führersonderzug) ==
The Führersonderzug train was named Führersonderzug "Amerika" in 1940, and later Führersonderzug "Brandenburg". The train was used as a headquarters until the Balkans campaign. Afterwards, the train was not used as Führer Headquarters, however Hitler continued to travel on it throughout the war between Berlin, Berchtesgaden, Munich and other headquarters.

== See also ==
- National redoubt (the supposed Nazi "Alpenfestung" (Alpine Fortress))
- Nazi architecture
- Vorbunker
