= Führerhauptquartier Olga =

- Near Orsha in Belarus

Site information
- Type: Führerhauptquartier

Site history
- Built: 1943

Führerhauptquartier Olga was a bunker facility part built near the town of Orsha in the Soviet Union during World War II. The facility was built by the organization Todt on the road near Orsha, some 200 kilometers northeast of Minsk, between July and September 1943. The complex consisted of a bunker, some blockhouses and several wooden barracks.

The first discussions on the construction of the facility took place on 20 June 1943 in the Wolfschanze in East Prussia. Further planning took place on site on 27 June 1943. Führerhauptquartier Olga was never completed and abandoned in October 1943 after the end of Operation Zitadelle and the subsequent withdrawal of the German Wehrmacht. By the end of the project, around 400 cubic meters of concrete had been installed and barracks and blockhouses with an area of 3599 square meters had been built. The security bunker complex planned for Hitler was not completed.
