= Anlage =

Anlage may refer to:

- Allele, a specific version of a gene, as used by Gregor Mendel
- Anlage Süd, a headquarters facility of the German Third Reich in Strzyżów, Poland
- Primordium, the initial clustering of embryonic cells from which a body part develops
- Temperament, the predisposition personality type in psychology
