= Führerhauptquartier Tannenberg =

Nazi Germany military command facility

Tannenberg
- Germany

Site information
- Type: Command and control

Location
- Tannenberg location on a map of pre-1945 Germany
- Coordinates: 48°29′44″N 8°15′49″E

Site history
- Built: 1939
- Built by: Organisation Todt
- In use: 1940
- Fate: abandoned / demolished

Führerhauptquartier Tannenberg (also known as "Installation T") was a Führer Headquarters built in 1939 for use as a military command and control facility by Adolf Hitler. It was located near Freudenstadt and Hitler stayed there for a week in 1940 while inspecting the fortresses that formed the Maginot Line.

== History ==
Tannenberg was constructed on Kniebis Mountain in the heart of the Black Forest on the grounds of an existing installation of Germany's western air defense zone near Freudenstadt. Built by the Organization Todt in the winter of 1939–1940, it has been described as a prototype for the Wolf's Lair. The site's designation, "Tannenberg", was from the Battle of Tannenberg during World War I.

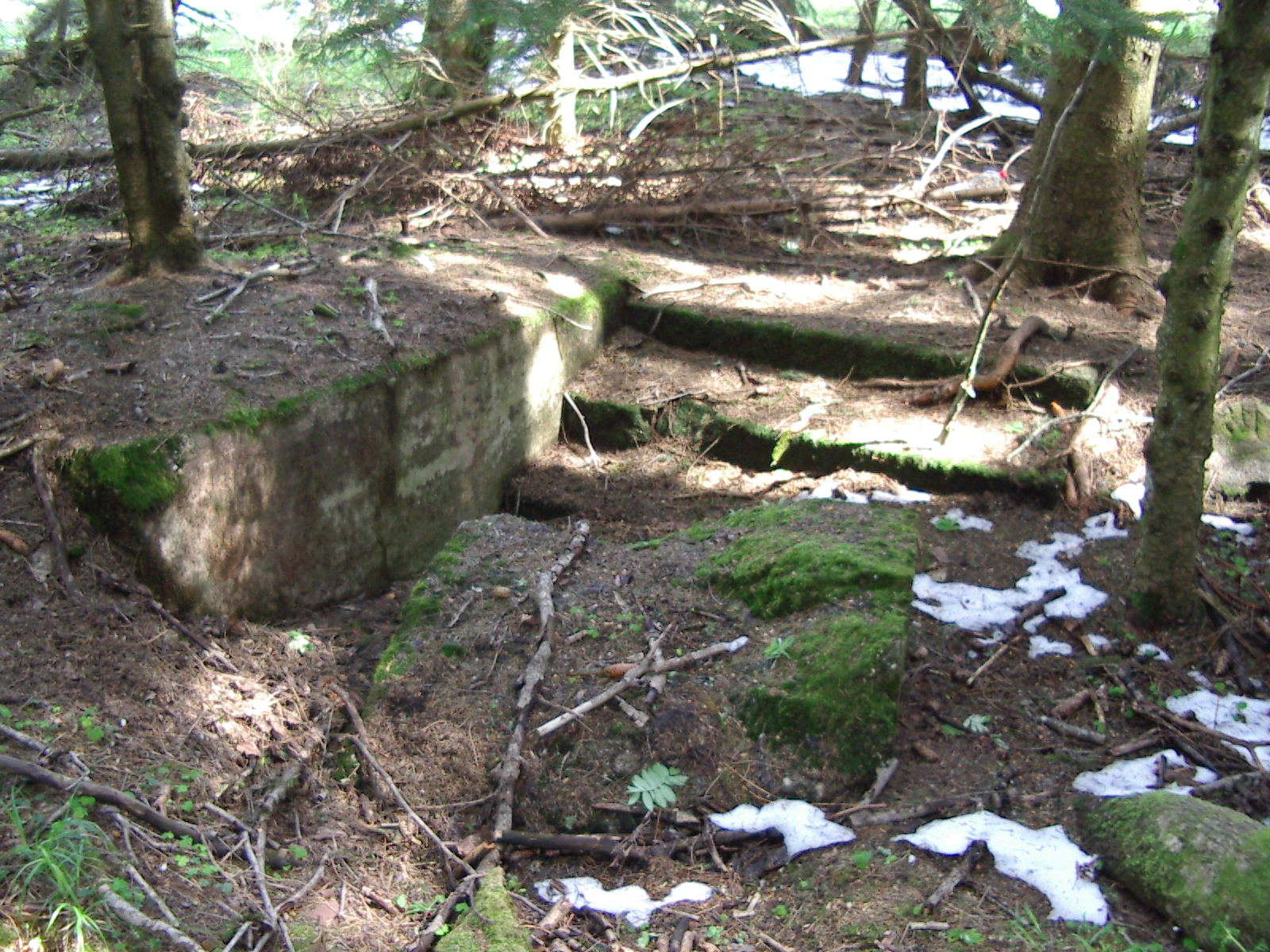
The ruins of Tannenberg pictured in 2012

Hitler stayed at the Führerhauptquartier Tannenberg from 28 June to 5 July 1940, following the Fall of France, using it as a base from which to tour the fortresses of the Maginot Line. This is the only time it was known to have been used by Hitler.

Most of the buildings were demolished during the German withdrawal from the Western Front in 1945. One building, which remained standing, was subsequently used to store fertilizer and other supplies by foresters.

As of 2015, the location of Tannenberg sits within the Black Forest National Park.

== Design and layout ==
Tannenberg consisted of two concrete bunkers, one used as Hitler's private quarters and a second as a communications facility. The site also included a number of wooden-framed structures, including a mess hall, barracks, guest quarters, a conference centre, and a guard house. The perimeter of the complex was ringed with barbed wire.

== See also ==
- Adlerhorst - a nearby Führerhauptquartier
