= Führersonderzug =

1939–1945 train for Adolf Hitler

- Manufacturer: Deutsche Reichsbahn
- Built at: Henschel; Krauss-Maffei; Credé
- Constructed: 1937–39
- Entered service: 1939
- Scrapped: 1945
- Capacity: 200+
- Operator: Deutsche Reichsbahn

Specifications
- Train length: 10–16 components 300–430 meters (985–1,410 ft)
- Maximum speed: 80–120 km/h (50–75 mph)
- Weight: 1,200 tons
- Engine type: 2x BR 52 "Kriegslok"; Class KDL1 locomotives

The Führersonderzug (from German: "Leader's special train") was Adolf Hitler's personal train. It was named Führersonderzug "Amerika" in 1940, and in January 1943, was renamed the Führersonderzug "Brandenburg". The train served as Hitler's headquarters until the Balkans campaign. Afterwards, the train was not used as Führer Headquarters (Führerhauptquartier), however Hitler continued to travel on it throughout the war between Berlin, Berchtesgaden, the Wolfsschanze and his other military headquarters.

== Usage ==
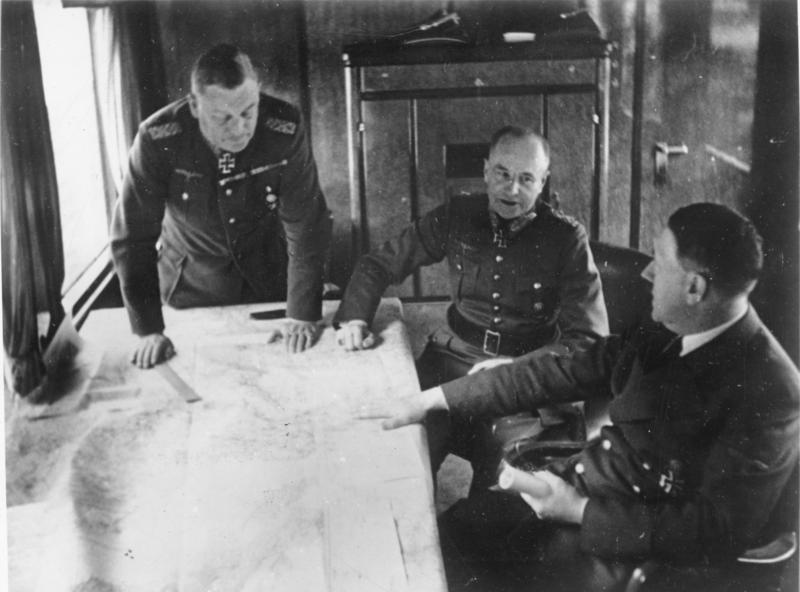
Von Brauchitsch, Keitel and Hitler aboard the Führersonderzug, April 1941

Before the first permanent Führer Headquarters Felsennest was used in May 1940, the Führersonderzug served as a mobile headquarters. Hitler and his entourage used this train to visit various fronts and theaters of war. For safety, a front train and rear train were used to prevent any possible attack.

The train was originally named Führersonderzug "Amerika", purportedly because Hitler wanted to pay homage to the European conquest of the Americas. After Germany declared war on the United States, on December 11, 1941, the train was renamed to the Führersonderzug "Brandenburg".

In late April 1945, Hitler ordered his aide and adjutant Julius Schaub to travel to Austria to destroy the Führersonderzug.

== Components ==
The exact composition of the train on any journey is not known; documentation for each journey was destroyed after the trip to prevent it being used to plan an attack. Some details were revealed by the departure information "Bln 2009", when the train departed the Anhalter Bahnhof in Berlin on 23 June 1941, arriving at Wolfsschanze on 24 June 1941;

The individual 10-16 components (locomotives and railway cars) in order were:

- Two DRB Class 01.10 streamlined locomotives)
- a special Flakwagen armoured anti-aircraft train flatbed car with two anti-aircraft guns, most often a pair of quadruple 20mm Flakvierling batteries, one at each end of the car. It also had the quarters for the officers and men from the Luftwaffe 9 Regiment General Göring that manned the guns. Goering's trainset flak cars used anti-aircraft cannons.
- a baggage car
- the Führerwagen, used by Hitler
- a Befehlswagen (command car), including a conference room and a communications centre
- a Begleitkommandowagen, for the accompanying twenty-two-man security force (SS-Begleit-Kommando and Reichssicherheitsdienst detachment)
- a dining car
- two cars for guests
- a Badewagen (bathing car)
- another dining car
- two sleeping cars for personnel
- a Pressewagen (press car) for press chief, Otto Dietrich, and staff
- another baggage car
- another Flakwagen

Otto Dietrich indicates that the Flakwagen never had to be used when Hitler was travelling. The Pressewagen was to receive and release press reports, not for journalists.

== Other Sonderzüge ==
There were other special trains (Sonderzüge in German) used by prominent German officials;

- Ministerzug (Ministers' Train), used by Joachim von Ribbentrop and Heinrich Himmler
- Sonderzug "Afrika" (also called "Braunschweig"), used by the chief of the Armed Forces High Command (Oberkommando der Wehrmacht, OKW)
- Sonderzug "Asien" (also called "Pommern"), used by Hermann Göring
- Sonderzug "Atlantik" (also called "Auerhahn", "capercaillie"), used by the supreme commander of the Navy (Kriegsmarine)
- Sonderzug "Atlas" (also called "Franken," 'Franconia'), a command train used by the Armed Forces Operations Staff (Wehrmachtführungsstabes)
- Sonderzug "Enzian" ("gentian"), a command train used by the chief of the Intelligence branch of the Luftwaffe (Nachrichtenwesens der Luftwaffe)
- Sonderzug "Ostpreußen" ('East Prussia', also called "Sonderzug 4"), used by the Army General Staff (Oberkommando des Heeres, OKH) (Note: From December 1941, Hitler was Supreme Commander of OKH)
- Sonderzug "Robinson 1", used by the chief of the Command Staff of the Luftwaffe
- Sonderzug "Robinson 2", used by the chief of the General Staff of the Luftwaffe
- Sonderzug "Steiermark" ('Styria', also called "Heinrich" and "Transport 44"), used by Heinrich Himmler
- Sonderzug "Westfalen", used by Joachim von Ribbentrop
- Sonderzug "Württemberg", used by the Army General Staff (Gen. St.d. H. – Generalstabs des Heeres)

== See also ==
- 1937 tour of Germany by the Duke and Duchess of Windsor – The Duke and Duchess toured Germany on the Führersonderzug
