= Stępina =

- Village
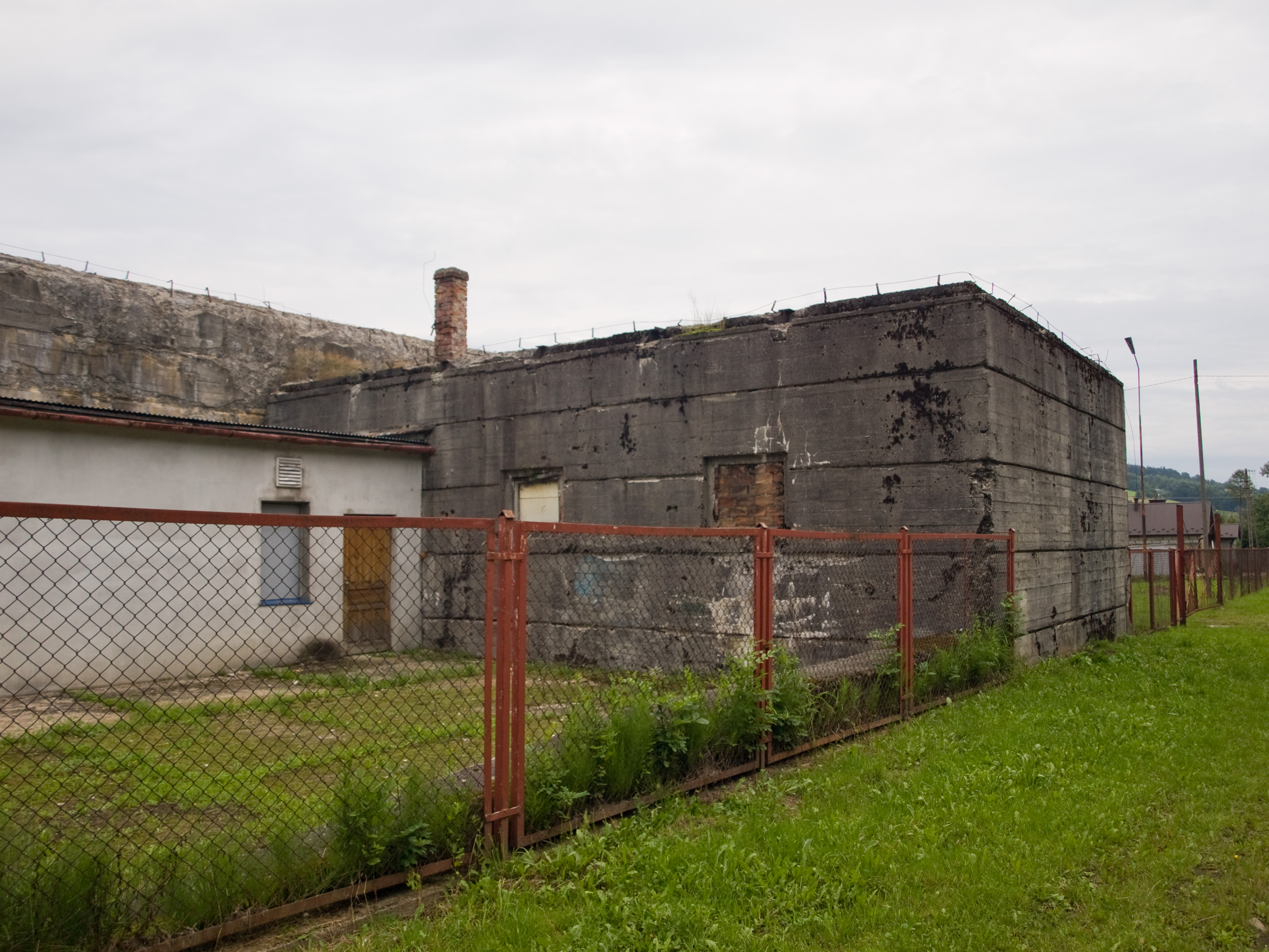
- "Hitler's Bunker" built in 1940-1941

- Location within Poland
- Coordinates: 49°53′N 21°34′E
- Country: Poland
- Voivodeship: Subcarpathian
- County: Strzyżów
- Gmina: Frysztak
- Population (approx.): 920

Stępina pronounced [stɛmˈpʲina] is a village in the administrative district of Gmina Frysztak, within Strzyżów County, Subcarpathian Voivodeship, in south-eastern Poland.

== World War II ==
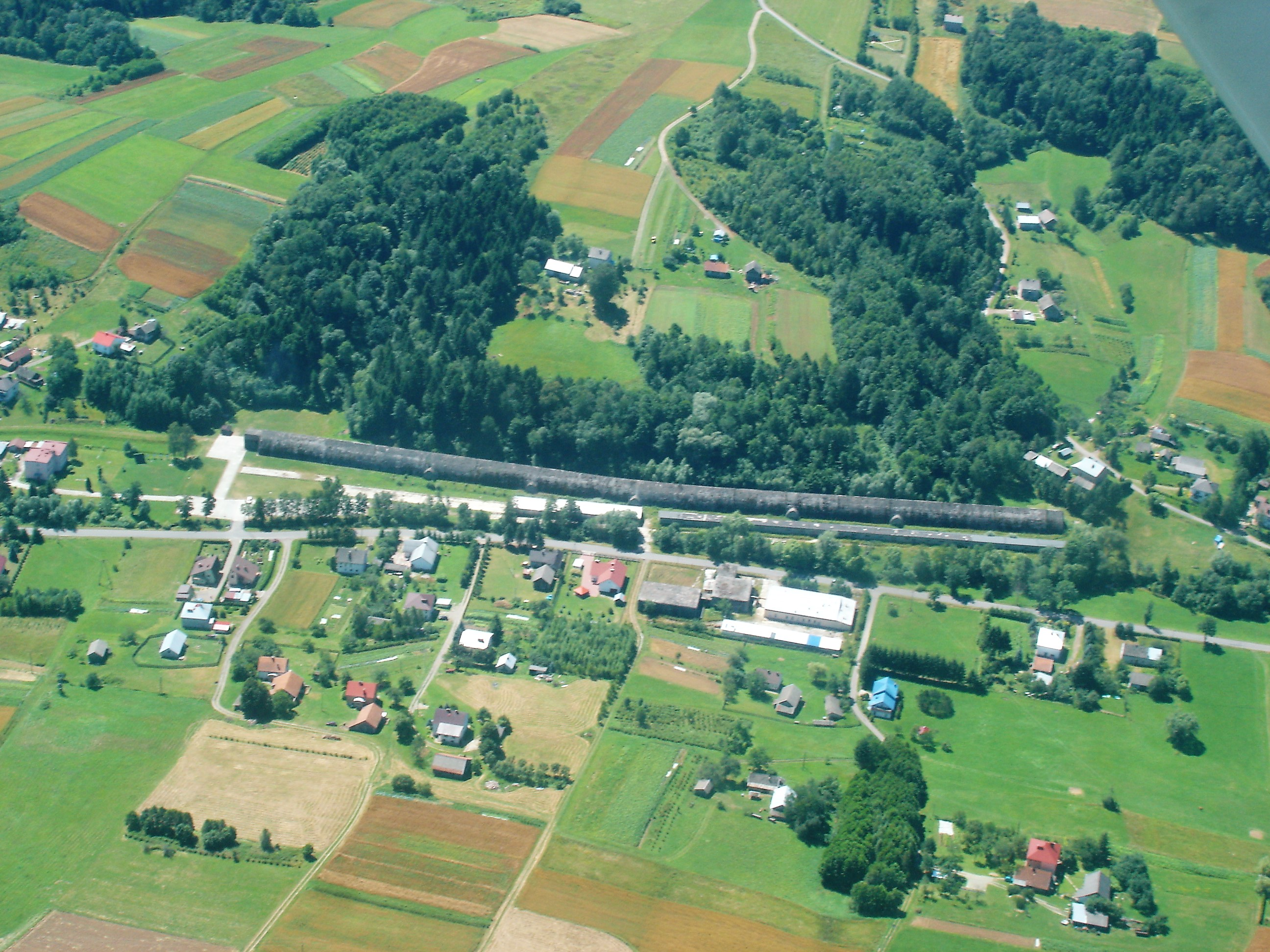
Hitler's Anlage Süd and his train bunker in Sępina

1	Entrance to train bunker
2	End of train bunker
3	Hitler's bunker used for a meeting with Mussolini

Stępina is the location of one of Hitler's bunkers called Anlage Süd, built in 1940-1941 with slave-labor from the Szebnie concentration camp nearby. Over the course of the camp's operation some 10,000 people perished, including Soviet prisoners of war, Polish Jews, non-Jewish Poles, as well as Ukrainians and Romani people.

The remains of the camp in Szebnie were entered by the Soviets on 8 September 1944 during counter-offensive of the Red Army.
