= Gierłoż, Kętrzyn County =

Gierłoż
- Village
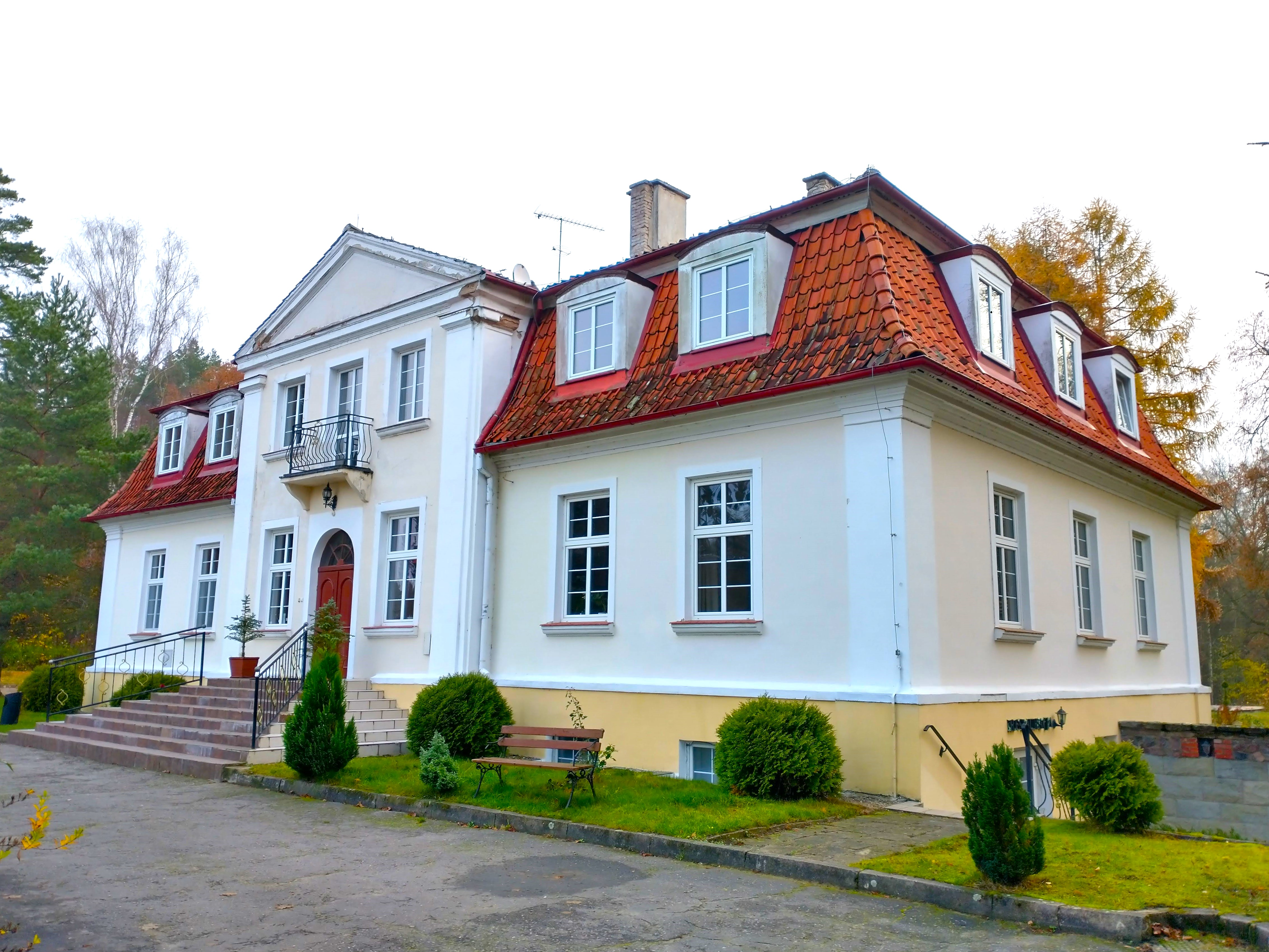
- Old manor house in Gierłoż

- Location within Poland
- Coordinates: 54°5′0″N 21°30′0″E
- Country: Poland
- Voivodeship: Warmian-Masurian
- County: Kętrzyn
- Gmina: Kętrzyn
- Population: 24
- Time zone: UTC+1 (CET)
  - Summer (DST): UTC+2 (CEST)
- Vehicle registration: NKE

Gierłoż (pronounced g(i)-ER-wuzh [ˈɡʲɛrwɔʂ], German: Görlitz) is a village in the administrative district of Gmina Kętrzyn, within Kętrzyn County, Warmian–Masurian Voivodeship, in north-eastern Poland.

== History ==
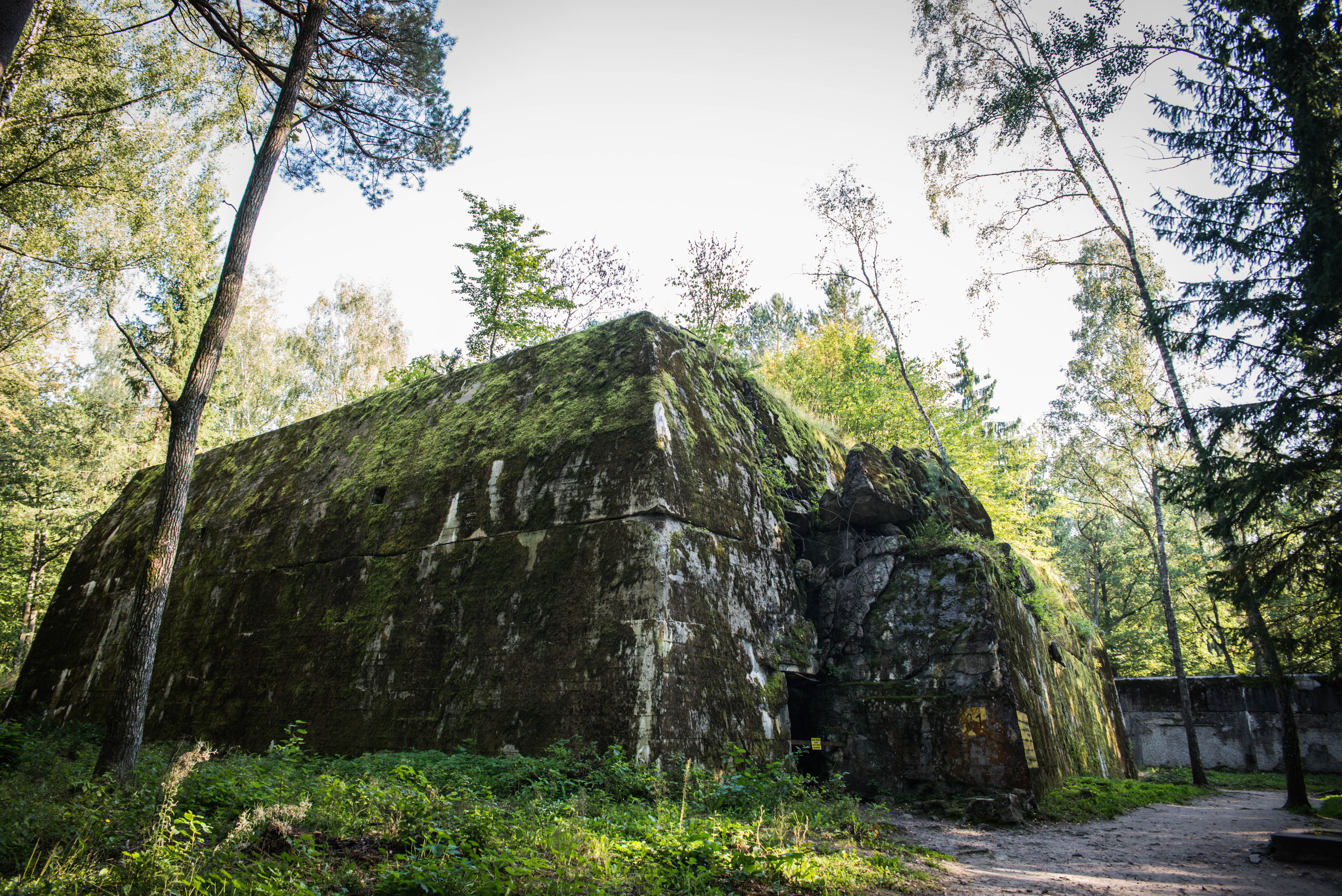
Wolf's Lair

The village, under the German name Görlitz was established in 1353, when the area was part of the State of the Teutonic Order. Its name derives from the Teutonic prosecutor Hans von Görlitz. In 1454 King Casimir IV Jagiellon incorporated the village and region into the Kingdom of Poland upon the request of the Prussian Confederation. After the subsequent Thirteen Years' War (1454–1466) and Second Peace of Thorn, it was a part of Poland as a fief held by the Teutonic Order. From 1525, it was part of Ducal Prussia, a vassal duchy of Poland until 1657. In the 18th century it became part of the Kingdom of Prussia, and since 1773 it was administratively located in the province of East Prussia. Following the unification of Germany in 1871, it joined the Prussian-led German Empire.

During World War II, Adolf Hitler's military headquarters from June 21, 1941, to November 20, 1944, were situated here in a bunker, called the Wolf's Lair. After the 1945 defeat of Nazi Germany in the war, the village became again part of Poland in accordance with the Potsdam Agreement and renamed to Gierłoż.
