= Führer Headquarters Wasserburg =

Nazi Führer Headquarters in the Soviet Union

Coordinates: 57°50′06″N 28°15′47″E

Map of the Führer Headquarters-FHQ Wasserburg is depicted on the upper right side of the map

The Führerhauptquartier Wasserburg, also known simply as "Wasserburg", was a bunker facility built by the Organization Todt as a front-line Führer Headquarters for Adolf Hitler during the Second World War about four kilometers north-west of Pleskau (Russian: Pskov) in the Soviet Union, on a loop of the Welikaja River.

The construction began on 1 November 1942. The centerpiece of the complex was an old castle-like mansion. The bunker was never used by Hitler, but after its completion it was used by Army Group North (Heeresgruppe Nord) of the Wehrmacht as a military headquarters.
