= Anlage Süd =

Polish pair of railway headquarters built for Adolf Hitler

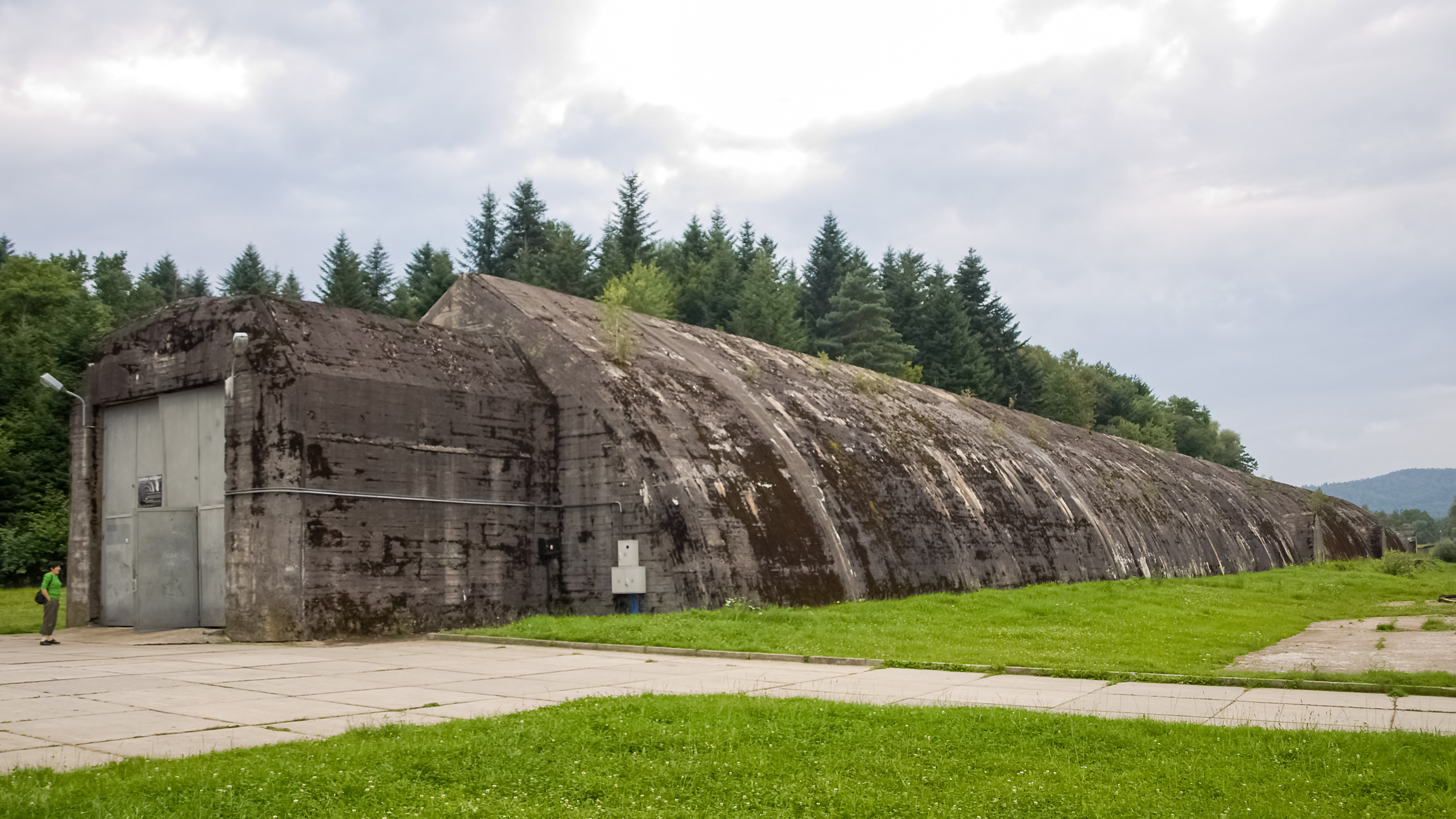
The surviving military railway bunker at Stępina, which was part of Anlage Süd, July 2011

Anlage Süd (English: Installation South) was a pair of railway headquarters built for Adolf Hitler in the Nazi-occupied part of southern Poland during the Second World War. Two reinforced tunnels were built near the rail line between Rzeszów and Jasło. The first massive train bunker (with adjacent conference bunker) was located in the village of Stępina (45 km southwest of Rzeszów), and the other was in the town of Strzyżów (30 km southwest of Rzeszów). They were initially used for a two-day meeting between Hitler and Italian fascist leader Benito Mussolini, on 27–28 August 1941.

== Bunkers ==
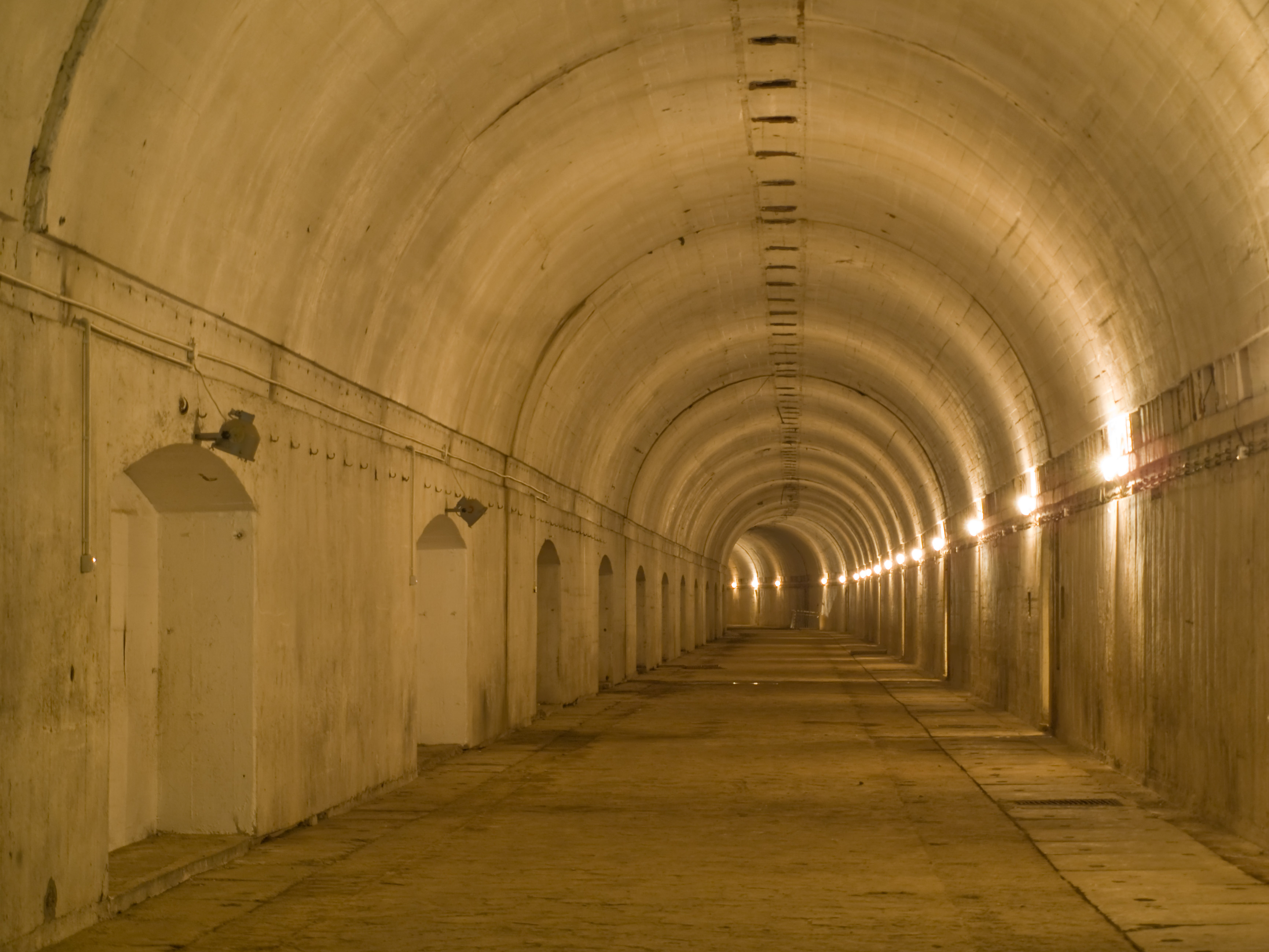
The former railway bunker at Stępina where the train of Benito Mussolini stayed in August 1941

Both 480-metre long railway tunnels at Stępina and Strzyżów were built by the Todt Organization using Polish slave labor from nearby concentration camps. The shelters were constructed to be 8.3 metres (27 ft) wide and 12 metres (39 ft) high with reinforced concrete walls 2 metres (6 ft 7 in) thick.

The tunnels were surrounded by barracks, personnel bunkers, and watchtowers. Other buildings were used for operations, administration, and maintenance. Inside each bomb-proof tunnel, there was a rail track and a platform. The tunnel portals were protected by two-wing armoured doors with firing embrasures for the guards. Purpose-built track connected the tunnels with the Rzeszów-Jasło railway.

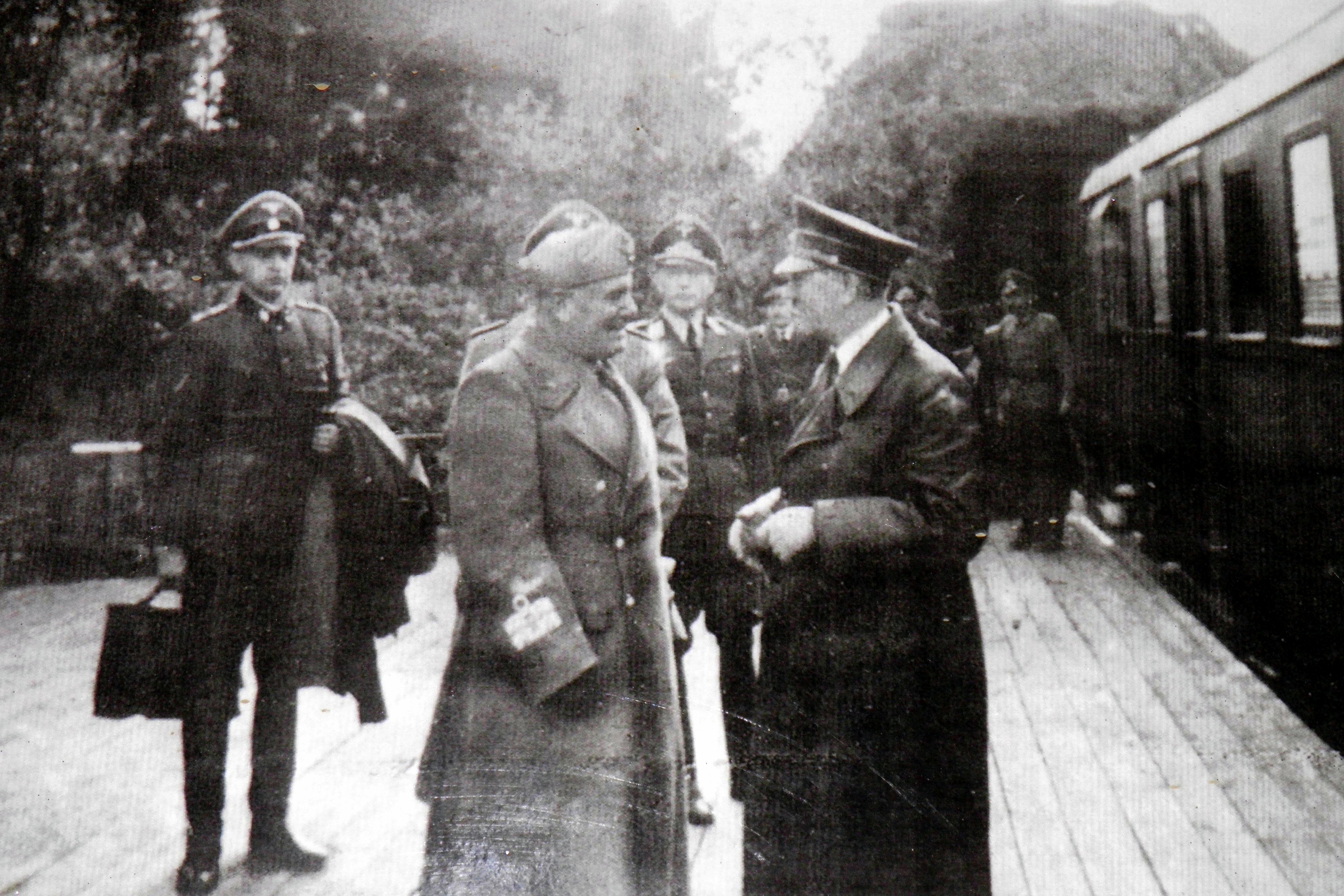
Meeting of Adolf Hitler and Benito Mussolini in Stępina, 27 August 1941

== Usage ==
After the headquarters was completed in summer 1941, Hitler first visited on 27 August for a meeting with Mussolini. Both leaders arrived by train. Hitler’s train (German: Führersonderzug) stayed in the bunker at Strzyżów while Mussolini's engine and carriages were at Stępina. The actual meeting to discuss the war with Soviet Russia, which lasted several hours, was held aboard Hitler’s train, which he never left. The next day, his train was the first to depart.

Hitler revisited the bunkers once more by train in October 1941. Other prominent visitors to use Anlage Süd included Reichsführer-SS Heinrich Himmler, Field Marshal Wilhelm Keitel and General Erwin Rommel.

By the summer of 1944 the facilities were abandoned because of the Soviet advance. When the Russians captured the tunnels in August 1944 they used them as field hospitals. After the war, the Stępina bunker was used for mushroom production. Today it is a state museum.

== See also ==
- Führer Headquarters
