= Führerhauptquartier Bärenhöhle =

German military bunker

Coordinates: 54°46′53″N 31°53′45″E

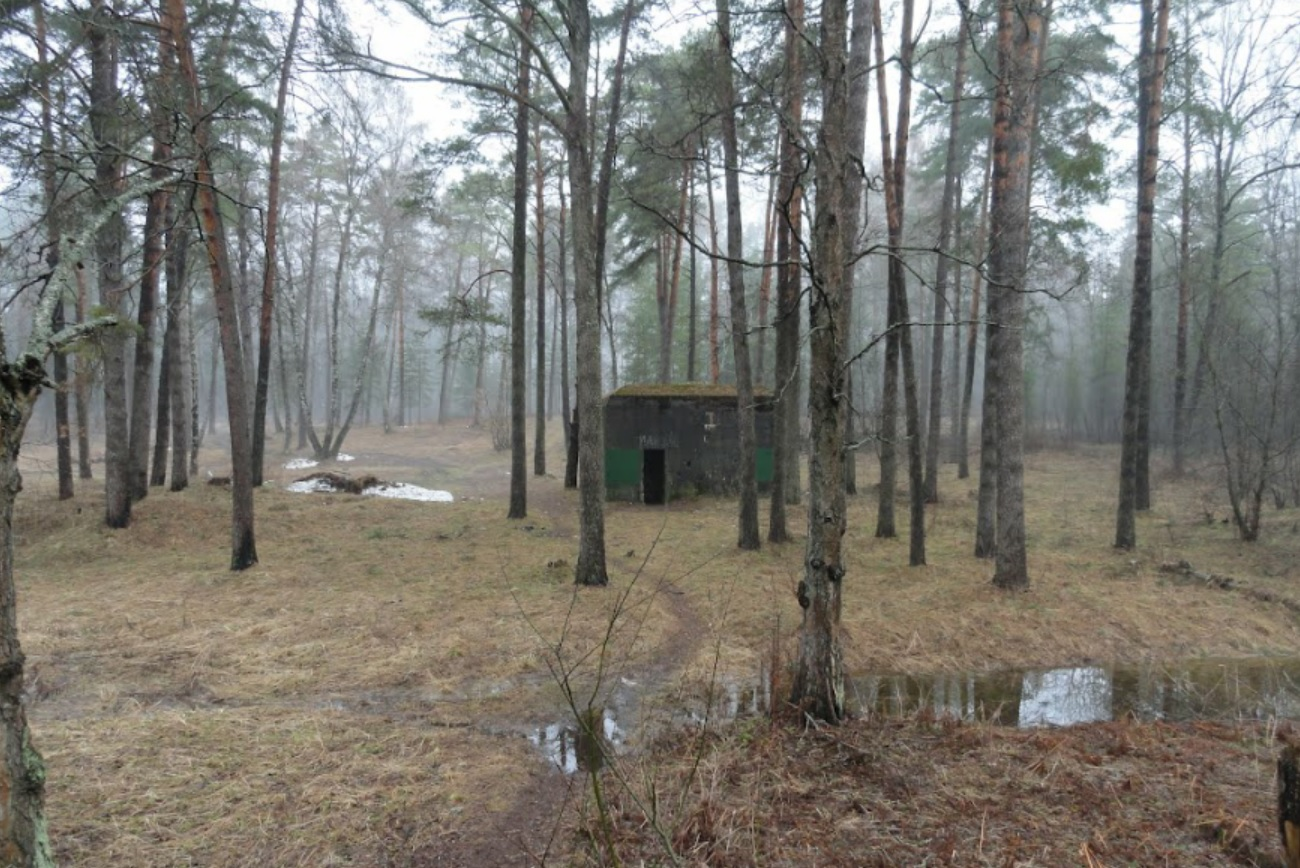
FHQ Bärenhöhle, the entrance bunker in 2013

The Führerhauptquartier Bärenhöhle (engl.: Führer headquarters bears cave) was a bunker facility built by the German organization Todt, which was built during the Second World War near Smolensk in the Soviet Union.

Bunker N1: It consists of a 43 square meter cubic superstructure still visible today. The subterranean dimensions have not yet been explored. The bunker facility is located in a forest about one kilometer from the town of Gnyozdovo on the road from Smolensk to Katyn. In addition to the bunker facility, the railway embankment of the former special track is still visible.

The facility was never used by Hitler as headquarters. The space in the forest "krasny Bor" near the bunker N1 had many buildings and was used as the headquarters of Army Group Center. Described in the book Strik-Strikfeldt "Against Hitler and Stalin". Hitler visited this place within one or two days.

Bunker 2, the twin located less than 1 kilometer from N1, is privately owned and has not been explored. The owner in the style of a KGB agent is categorically silent about the available underground facilities. According to one version, Hitler's underground bunker was located under the N2 building, and N1 was used only as a shelter for Hitler during an air raid. Since pre-war times, the Bunker 2 area was a secret location of the NKVD, and during the Cold War, a reserve control point for the 50th Smolensk Missile Army and the Western District. All this made any exploration of the area impossible. In the same area, and possibly on the former premises of the German headquarters, after the war, the dacha of the 1st secretary of the Regional Committee of the Communist Party, and recently the governor, was located. Recent studies were conducted not in the most promising places to search.

== Links ==
- Hitler's bunker in Smolensk
