= Wolf's Lair =

Adolf Hitler's Eastern Front military headquarters during World War II

- Wolfsschanze
- Part of Führerhauptquartiere
- Present-day Gierłoż, Poland
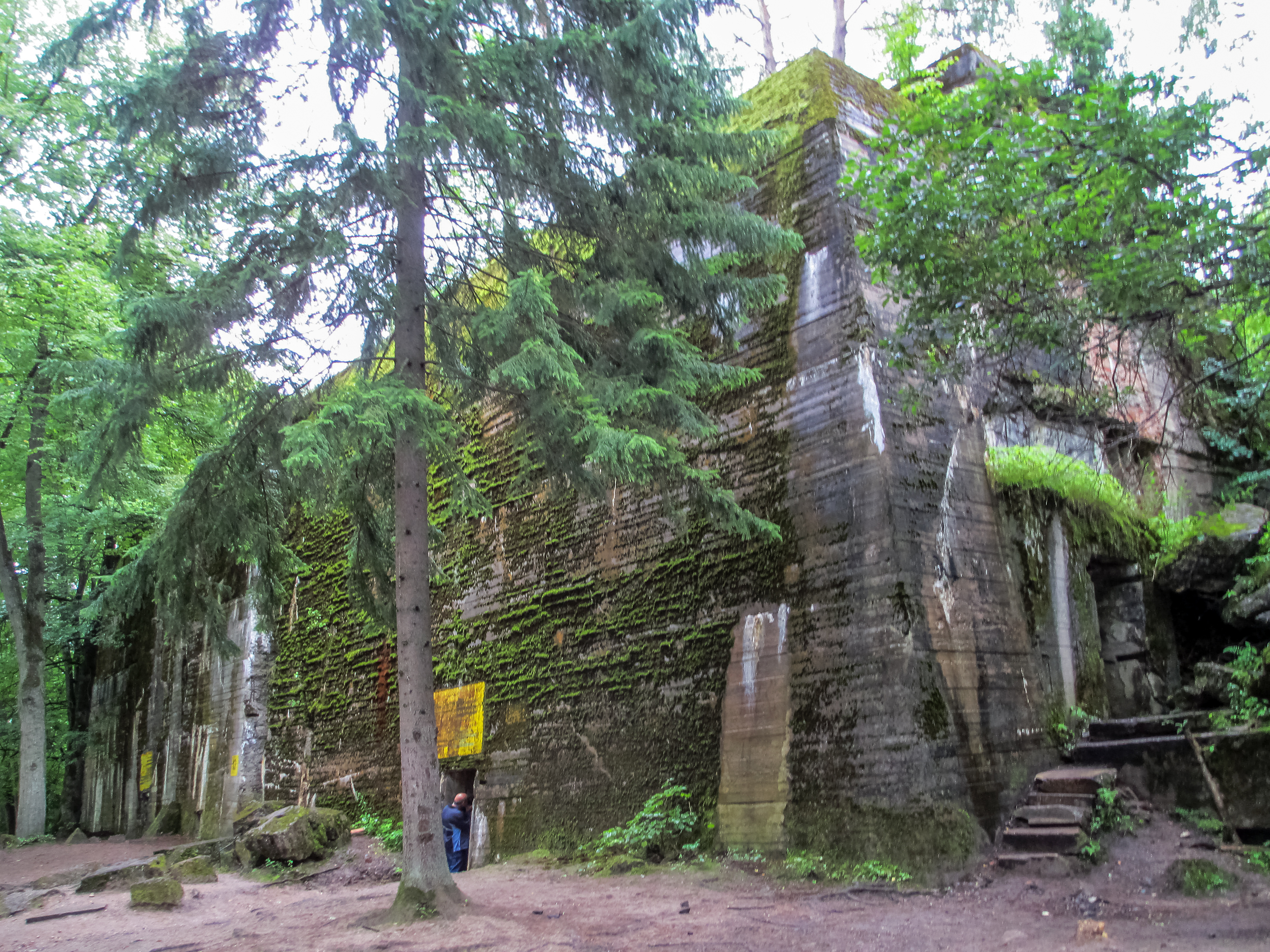
- Hitler's reinforced bunker at the Wolfsschanze

- Location within historic and present-day borders

Site information
- Type: Camouflaged concrete bunkers
- Owner: Polish Government
- Open to the public: Yes
- Condition: Mostly destroyed

Location
- Location within Poland
- Location within Poland Location within Germany
- Coordinates: 54.0804°N 21.4941°E

Site history
- Built: 1941; 85 years ago
- Built by: Hochtief AG, Organisation Todt
- In use: June 1941 – January 1945
- Materials: 2 m (6 ft 7 in) steel-reinforced concrete
- Fate: Partially demolished by retreating German forces
- Events: 20 July Plot

Garrison information
- Past commanders: Johann Rattenhuber
- Garrison: Reichssicherheitsdienst; Führerbegleitbrigade
- Occupants: Adolf Hitler; Government of Nazi Germany; Oberkommando der Wehrmacht

The Wolf's Lair (German: Wolfsschanze; Polish: Wilczy Szaniec) was Adolf Hitler's first Eastern Front military headquarters in World War II. Currently, it is a museum open to the public, as well as a hotel, conference room and restaurant.

The headquarters was located in the Masurian woods, near the village of Görlitz (now Gierłoż), about 8 kilometres (5 miles) east of the town of Rastenburg (now Kętrzyn), in present-day Poland. The central complex and the Führer's bunker were surrounded by three security zones guarded by two Schutzstaffel (SS) units: the SS-Begleitkommando des Führers and the Reichssicherheitsdienst.

The Wehrmacht's armored Führerbegleitbrigade was held in readiness nearby but, as a part of the German Army's elite Großdeutschland Division, was used to counter-attack Red Army break-throughs in Army Group Centre's front and rescue cut-off Army, Air Force, paratrooper, and SS armoured troops.

The 20 July plot, an assassination attempt against Hitler, took place at the Wolf's Lair on 20 July 1944.

== Name ==
The name Wolfsschanze is derived from "Wolf", a nickname of Hitler used only by his close friends. "Wolf" was used in several titles of Hitler's headquarters throughout occupied Europe, such as Wolfsschlucht I and II in Belgium and France, and Werwolf in Ukraine. The name Adolf itself originates in Germanic Athalwolf, "noble wolf".

Although the standard translation in English is "Wolf's Lair", a Schanze in German denotes a sconce, redoubt, or temporary fieldwork. The German translation for the lair of a wolf is Höhle (cave) or Bau (dwelling).

== History ==
As part of the preparations for the coming Operation Barbarossa, the decision was made in late 1940 to build a military headquarters for the Führer in Central Europe, similar in concept to the Felsennest in Western Europe. Like the Felsennest, the new headquarters had to be as close to the front as possible, but far enough to be safe from enemy forces.

Eventually, a top-secret site was chosen in the middle of the Masurian woods, in what was then East Prussia, far from roads and urban areas, and accessible only by a single railway and small airstrip. To maintain secrecy, locals were told that the construction works were for a new cement factory. The Organisation Todt completed construction of the entire 6.5 km^{2} (2 1/2 mi^{2}) complex by 21 June 1941.

Hitler first arrived at the headquarters on 24 June 1941, two days after Barbarossa commenced. At its peak, over 2,000 people lived and worked at the Wolf's Lair, including food-tasters to sample Hitler's food before he ate it to guard him against being poisoned. Additional construction work began in mid-1944 to enlarge and reinforce many of the original buildings on the site on Hitler's orders, although the work was never completed because of the Red Army's rapid advance during the Baltic Offensive.

Hitler left the Wolf's Lair for the final time in November 1944 after having spent over 800 days there, the longest he had stayed at any place over the course of the war, during a 3 1/2-year period.

== Layout ==
The buildings within the complex were camouflaged with bushes, grass, and artificial trees on the flat roofs; netting was also erected between buildings and the surrounding forest so that the installation looked like unbroken dense woodland from the air. The site consisted of three concentric security zones.

- Sperrkreis 1 (Security Zone 1) was located at the heart of the Wolf's Lair, the perimeter was ringed by steel fencing and guarded by the SS Reichssicherheitsdienst (RSD). Within the compound, security was managed by Dienststelle I (command I) from the SS-Begleitkommando des Führers (FBK) which operated under the auspices of Obersturmbannführer Bruno Gesche. These were the only armed guards Hitler allowed to be near him. They never had to surrender their weapons and were never searched whereas the RSD were required to remain at positions some distance away from Hitler. The zone contained the Führer Bunker and ten other camouflaged bunkers built from 2-metre-thick (6 ft 7 in) steel-reinforced concrete. These shelters protected members of Hitler's inner circle such as Joseph Goebbels, Martin Bormann, Hermann Göring, Wilhelm Keitel, and Alfred Jodl. Hitler's accommodation was on the shaded northern side of the Führer Bunker. Both Hitler's and Keitel's bunkers had additional rooms where military conferences could be held.
- Sperrkreis 2 (Security Zone 2) surrounded the inner zone. The area housed the quarters of several Reich Ministers such as Fritz Todt, Albert Speer, and Joachim von Ribbentrop. It also housed the quarters of the personnel who worked in the Wolf's Lair and the military barracks for the RSD.
- Sperrkreis 3 (Security Zone 3) was the heavily fortified outer security area which surrounded the two inner zones. It was defended by land mines and the Führerbegleitbrigade (FBB), a special armoured security unit from Wehrmacht which manned guardhouses, watchtowers, and checkpoints.

A facility for Army headquarters was also located near the complex. The FBK and RSD had responsibility for Hitler's personal security within the site, while external protection of the complex was provided by the FBB, which had become a regiment by July 1944. The FBB was equipped with tanks, anti-aircraft guns, and other heavy weapons. Any approaching aircraft could be detected up to 100 km (60 mi) from the site. Additional troops were also stationed about 75 km (45 mi) away.

1. Office and barracks of Hitler's bodyguard; 2. FBK/RSD command post; 3. Emergency generator; 4. Bunker; 5. Office of Otto Dietrich, Hitler's press secretary; 6. Conference room, site of the 20 July 1944 assassination attempt; 7. RSD command post; 8. Guest bunker and air-raid shelter; 9. RSD command post; 10. Secretariat under Philipp Bouhler; 11. Headquarters of Johann Rattenhuber, SS chief of Hitler's security department, and Post Office; 12. Radio and telex buildings; 13. Vehicle garages; 14. Railway siding for Hitler's Train; 15. Cinema; 16. Generator buildings; 17. Quarters of Morell, Bodenschatz, Hewel, Voß, Wolff, and Fegelein; 18. Stores; 19. Residence of Martin Bormann, Hitler's personal secretary; 20. Residence and bunker of Adolf Hitler; 21. Bormann's personal air-raid shelter for himself and staff; 22. Office of Hitler's adjutant and the Wehrmacht's personnel office; 23. Military and staff mess II; 24. Quarters of General Alfred Jodl, Chief of Operations of OKW; 25. Firefighting pond; 26. Office of the Foreign Ministry; 27. Quarters of Fritz Todt, then Albert Speer after Todt's death; 28. RSD command post; 29. Air-raid shelter with Flak and MG units on the roof; 30. Hitler's bunker and air-raid shelter; 31. New tea room; 32. Residence of General Field Marshal Wilhelm Keitel, supreme commander of OKW; 33. Old tea house; 34. Residence of Reichsmarschall Hermann Göring; 35. Göring's personal air-raid shelter for himself and staff, with Flak and MG on the roof; 36. Offices of the high command of the Air Force; 37. Offices of the high command of the Navy; 38. Bunker with Flak; 39. Cemetery; 40. Rastenburg railway line

=== Reinforcements ===
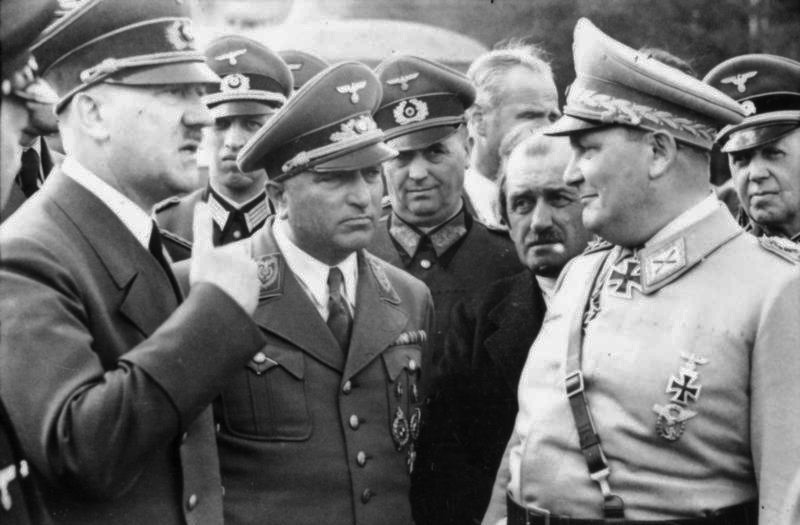
Hitler meeting Reich Commissioner Robert Ley, automotive engineer Ferdinand Porsche, and Reichsmarschall Hermann Göring at the Wolfsschanze in 1942

Hitler's secretary, Traudl Junge, recalled that Hitler repeatedly spoke in late 1943 or early 1944 of a possible bomber attack on the Wolfsschanze by the Western Allies. She quoted Hitler as saying, "They know exactly where we are, and sometime they're going to destroy everything here with carefully aimed bombs. I expect them to attack any day."

According to Speer, between 28 July 1941 and 20 March 1942, Hitler left Rastenburg only four times for a total of 57 days. Afterwards, Hitler spent the next three months in Obersalzberg before returning to Rastenburg for the next nine months.

Hitler's entourage returned to the Wolfsschanze from an extended summer stay at the Berghof in July 1944. The previous small bunkers had been replaced by the Organisation Todt with "heavy, colossal structures" of reinforced concrete as defense against the feared air attack. According to Armaments Minister Albert Speer, "some 36,000,000 marks were spent for bunkers in Rastenburg [Wolf's Lair]."

Hitler's bunker had become the largest, "a positive fortress" containing "a maze of passages, rooms and halls." Junge wrote, "We had air-raid warnings every day" in the period between the 20 July assassination attempt and Hitler's final departure from the Wolfsschanze in November 1944, "but there was never more than a single aircraft circling over the forest, and no bombs were dropped. All the same, Hitler took the danger very seriously, and thought all these reconnaissance flights were in preparation for the big raid he was expecting."

No air attack ever came; but it has never been revealed whether the Western Allies knew of the Wolfsschanze's location and importance. The Soviet Union was unaware of both the location and the scale of the complex until the site was uncovered by its forces during their advance towards Berlin in early 1945.

== Hitler's daily routine ==
Hitler would begin his day by taking a walk alone with his dog around 10 a.m. or so, and at 10:30 a.m. he looked at the mail that had been delivered by air or courier train. A noon situation briefing would be convened, either in Keitel's or Jodl's bunker, and frequently ran for two hours. This was followed by lunch at 2 p.m. in the dining hall. Hitler invariably sat in the same seat between Jodl and Otto Dietrich, while Keitel, Martin Bormann, and Göring's adjutant General Karl Bodenschatz sat opposite him.

After lunch, Hitler dealt with non-military matters for the remainder of the afternoon. Coffee was served around 5 p.m., followed by a second military briefing by Jodl at 6 p.m. Dinner could also last as long as two hours, beginning at 7:30 p.m., after which films were shown in the cinema. Hitler then retired to his private quarters where he gave monologues to his entourage till late, usually going to sleep around 3 or 4 a.m. Occasionally, Hitler and his entourage listened to gramophone records of Beethoven symphonies, selections from Wagner or other operas, or German lieder.

== Notable visitors ==
- Ion Antonescu – marshal of Romania
- Boris III of Bulgaria – tsar of Bulgaria
- Subhas Chandra Bose – national leader from India
- Dobri Bozhilov – prime minister of Bulgaria in 1943–44
- Galeazzo Ciano (minister of foreign affairs) – Italy
- Lajos Csatay von Csatai (general, ministry of war) – Hungary
- Rashid Ali al-Gaylani (former prime minister) – Iraq
- Italo Gariboldi (general) – Italy
- Rodolfo Graziani (marshal) – Italy
- Miklós Horthy (regent) – Hungary
- Gusztáv Jány (general) – Hungary
- Miklós Kállay (prime minister) – Hungary
- Prince Kiril of Bulgaria (prince of Bulgaria and Preslav, tsar successor) – Bulgaria
- Slavko Kvaternik (commander and minister of armed forces) – Croatia
- Pierre Laval (prime minister of Vichy regime) – France
- Konstantin Lukash (general, chief of staff of the Bulgarian Army) – Bulgaria
- Fanni Luukkonen (army colonel, leader of the voluntary auxiliary organisation for women) – Finland
- Carl Gustaf Emil Mannerheim (military leader and statesman) – Finland
- José Finat y Escrivá de Romaní (Conde de Mayalde, ambassador to Third Reich) – Spain
- Nikola Mihov (general, minister of war) – Bulgaria
- José Moscardó Ituarte (general) – Spain
- Benito Mussolini (prime minister) – Italy
- Milan Nedić – general and prime minister of Serbia
- Harald Öhquist – lieutenant general of Finland
- Hiroshi Ōshima (general, ambassador to Third Reich) – Japan
- Ante Pavelić – Poglavnik ("Head") of Croatia
- Jozef Tiso – Roman Catholic priest and President of Slovakia
- Cemil Cahit Toydemir – (general) – Turkey

== Assassination attempt ==
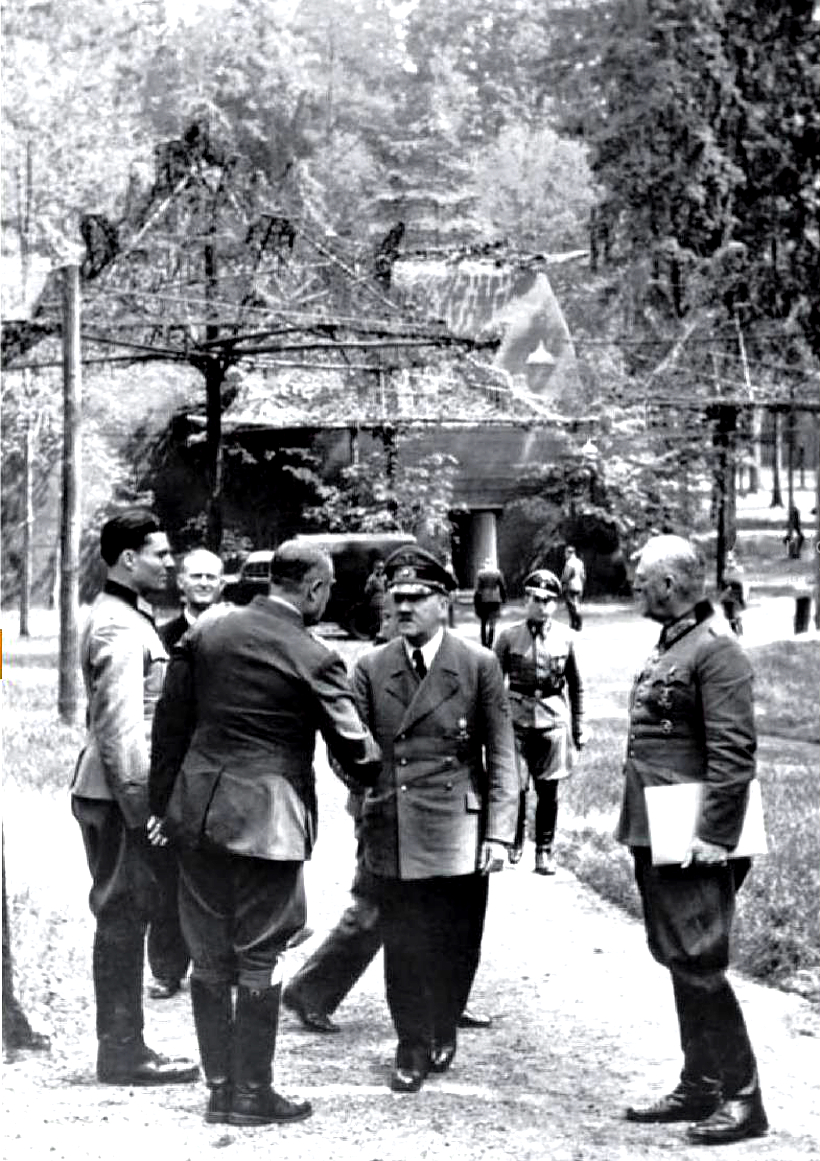
Claus Graf von Stauffenberg (left) meeting Adolf Hitler at the Wolf's Lair five days before the 20 July plot in 1944

On Thursday 20 July 1944 an attempt was made to kill Hitler at the Wolf's Lair. It was organized by a group of acting and retired army officers, as well as some civilians, who wanted to remove Hitler and establish a new democratic government in Germany that would negotiate a peaceful end to the war with the Allies before Germany's inevitable defeat, which had become apparent to both sides by then. However, the main challenge facing the conspirators was that Hitler's habit of last-minute changes to his schedule had led to the failure of attempts by others to kill him.

Eventually, the conspirators chose the Wolf's Lair as a viable location to target Hitler because it was the only place where they were sure they could get close enough to kill him. Staff officer Colonel Claus Graf von Stauffenberg volunteered to carry a bomb hidden in a briefcase into one of the daily military briefings usually held in the bunkers, in the hope that the heavy reinforcements of the bunkers could be turned against the Führer through the shockwave of the blast reverberating off the heavily reinforced walls of the room and certainly killing him.

However, on the day of the planned assassination, the location of the meeting was unexpectedly changed to a light brick hut due to Hitler's complaints about the immense heat within the bunkers that day. This change in venue, along with other factors, such as Hitler unexpectedly calling the meeting earlier than anticipated, would contribute to the eventual failure of the plot. Despite this change in plans, Graf von Stauffenberg went ahead with carrying out the plot. He carried the briefcase containing the bomb into the conference hut, making a request to be placed close to Hitler on grounds that he had trouble hearing due to his injuries sustained while fighting in North Africa, which would ensure that the bomb would be close enough to Hitler to be effective.

The bomb exploded at precisely 12:42 p.m., with Stauffenberg having excused himself from the meeting a few minutes before. The interior of the building was devastated, four officers were injured and would later die of their wounds but Hitler was only slightly injured. This was due to the fact that one of the other officers present at the meeting had, for his own comfort, moved the briefcase from where it had been put by Stauffenberg close to Hitler and placed it against one of the legs of the solid oak table being used for the meeting. Consequently, the thick, heavy table absorbed most of the blast and this, along with the collapse of some of the hut's thin walls thus dissipating the shockwave, caused the plot to fail.

Even before the bomb detonated, Stauffenberg and his adjutant, Lieutenant Werner von Haeften, had already begun their departure for Berlin where they planned to take control of the country alongside their fellow conspirators. Their escape involved passing through various security zones that controlled all access around the site. After a short delay at the RSD guard post just outside Sperrkreis 1, they were allowed to leave by vehicle. The two officers were then driven down the southern exit road towards the military airstrip near Rastenburg.

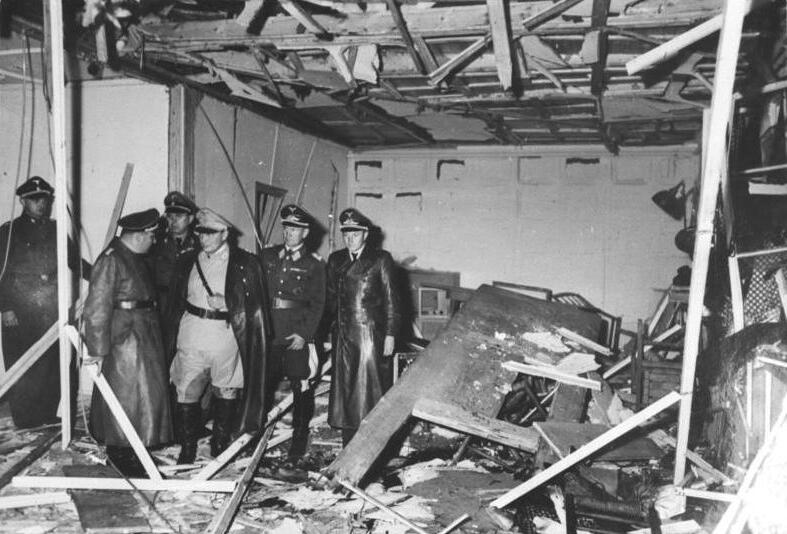
Hermann Göring surveys the conference room destroyed by the suitcase bomb left by Claus von Stauffenberg on 20 July 1944.

The alarm had been raised by the time they reached the guardhouse at the perimeter of Sperrkreis 2. According to the official RSHA report, "at first, the guard refused passage until Stauffenberg persuaded him to contact the adjutant to the compound commander who then finally authorized clearance". It was between here and the final checkpoint of Sperrkreis 3 that Haeften tossed another briefcase from the car containing an unused second bomb. The two men reached the outer limit of the security zones and were allowed to catch their plane back to army general headquarters in Berlin.

The attempted assassination was derived from Operation Valkyrie, a covert plan officially sanctioned by Hitler for the Reserve Army to take control and suppress any revolt in the country in the event of his untimely death, which the conspirators adapted to suit their purpose. Unfortunately for the conspirators, news soon arrived from the Wolf's Lair that Hitler was still alive. Upon hearing from Propaganda Minister Joseph Goebbels that Hitler was indeed alive, as well as speaking to the Führer himself, Major Otto Ernst Remer, in command of the Reserve Army's troops in Berlin still loyal to the regime, was fully convinced of Hitler's survival and he quickly re-established control of key government buildings and arrested the conspirators.

That same evening, Stauffenberg and his co-conspirators were summarily executed by gunshot outside the Bendlerblock in Berlin.

On 20 August 1944, Hitler personally presented survivors of the bomb blast with a "20 July 1944 Wound Badge". Next-of-kin of those killed in the blast were also given this award.

== Destruction and capture ==
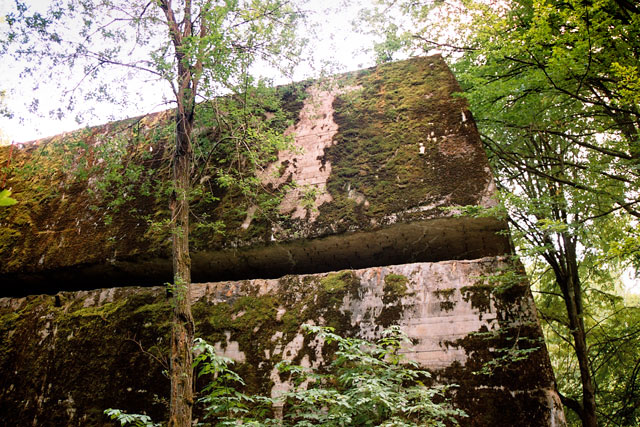
Enormous amounts of explosives were used by the retreating Germans to blow up the Wolf's Lair bunkers. Here the explosion has lifted a bunker's roof, made of solid ferro-concrete two meters thick.

The Red Army reached the borders of East Prussia during the Baltic offensive in October 1944. Hitler departed from the Wolf's Lair for the final time on Monday, 20 November 1944, when the Soviet advance reached Angerburg (now Węgorzewo), 15 km (9 mi) away. Two days later, the order was given to destroy the complex.

The demolition took place on the night of 24–25 January 1945, ten days after the start of the Red Army's Vistula–Oder offensive. Tons of explosives were used; one bunker required an estimated 8,000 kg (18,000 lb) of TNT. Most of the buildings were only partially destroyed due to their immense size and reinforced structures.

The Red Army captured the abandoned remains of the Wolf's Lair on 27 January without firing a shot, the same day that Auschwitz was liberated farther south.

== Historical site ==
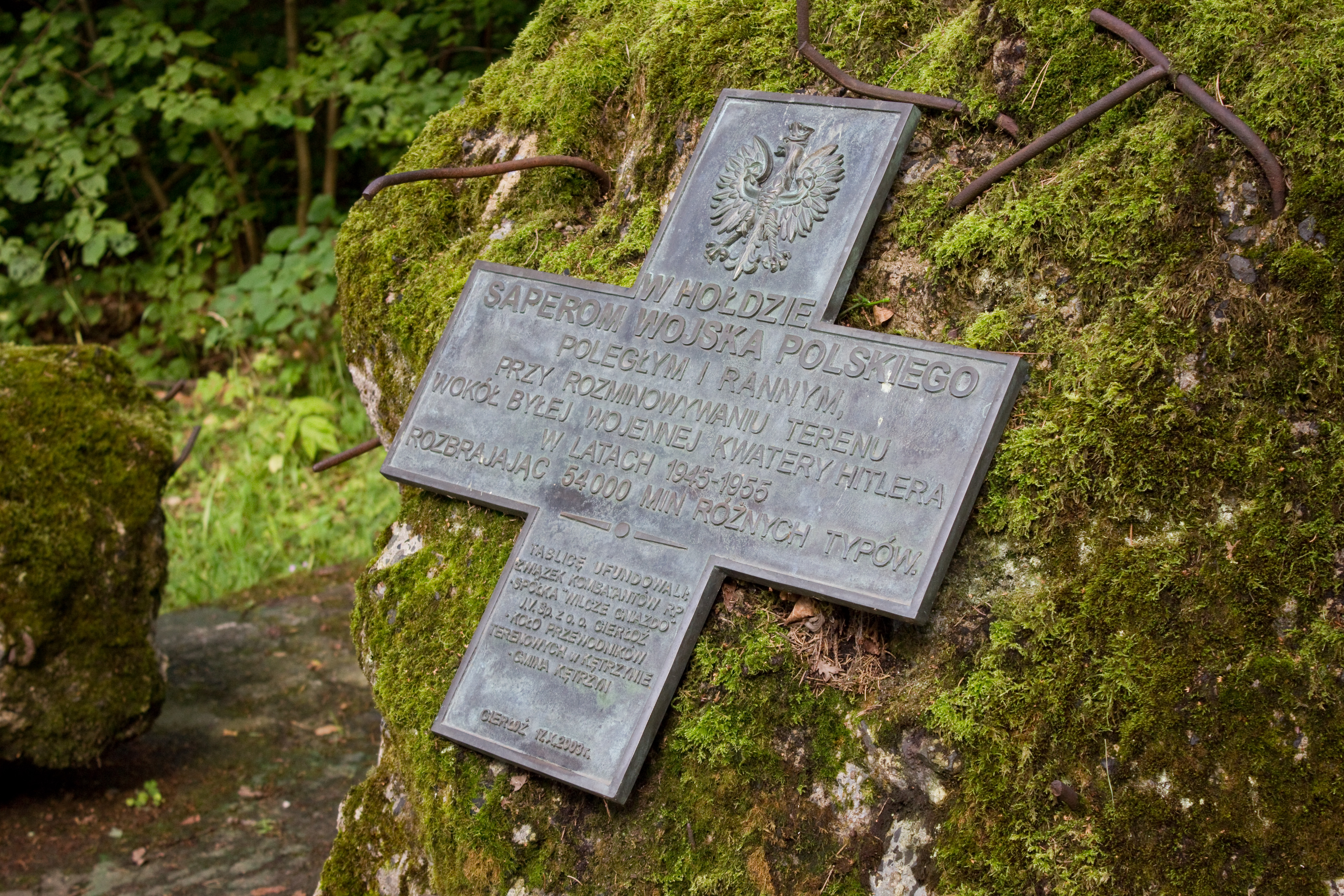
Memorial to Polish Army sappers who demined the area in 1945–1955

Following the war, more than 54,000 land mines were removed from the area, together with abandoned ordnance, and the entire site was left to decay by Poland's Communist government. Since the fall of Communism in the early 1990s, the Wolf's Lair has been developed as a tourist attraction. Visitors can make day trips from Warsaw or Gdańsk. Hotels and restaurants have grown up near the site. Plans have periodically been proposed to restore the area, including the installation of historical exhibits.

As of 2019, the site was drawing almost 300,000 visitors a year. The Srokowo Forest District, which manages the site, announced renovation and restoration plans for the historic site, including new accommodation options, expanded historical exhibitions, and other upgrades to improve visitor experience. Critics worried that the planned changes could turn the site into a place for neo-Nazi pilgrimages, although the District's spokesperson said that they would "make every effort" to maintain "due seriousness and respect for historical truth". Pawel Machcewicz, a Polish historian who specializes in World War II, said, "[T]he scars left by the war should be preserved and presented as a lesson, a warning ... Exhibitions should explain the history, contextualise the place, but not completely overshadow it."

In February 2023, the Srokowo Forest District officials announced that the renovation of the Wilczy Szaniec site had begun and is slated to be completed by the end of 2024. The project will include expanding and renovating the hotel and restaurant building, adding a new conference room, redesigning the exhibition space, as well as constructing a new observation deck.

In 2024, archaeologists exploring the complex's former living quarters of Hermann Göring reported discovering five human skeletons (three adults, a teenager and a baby believed to be a family) missing their hands and feet and lacking any traces of clothing or personal objects buried under the brick residence. Alongside each of the skeletons thunderbolt stones (Donnerkeil)—bullet-shaped fossils of extinct squid-like creatures called belemnoids—were found.

== See also ==
- Führer Headquarters
- Führerbunker
- Führersonderzug

== Bibliography ==
- Junge, Traudl, "Bis Zur Letzten Stunde: Hitlers Sekretärin erzählt ihr Leben", München: Claassen, 2002, pp. 131, 141, 162.
- Junge, Traudl, "Until the Final Hour: Hitler's Last Secretary", London: Weidenfeld & Nicolson, 2003, pp. 116, 126, 145.
- Junge, Traudl, "Voices from the Bunker", New York: G.P. Putnam's sons, 1989.
- Kershaw, Ian (2000). Hitler, 1936–45. New York: W.W. Norton. ISBN 978-0-393-04994-7.
- Speer, Albert, "Inside the Third Reich", New York and Toronto: Macmillan, 1970, p. 217.
