= Felsennest =

Führer headquarters

Coordinates: 50°32′45″N 6°46′10″E

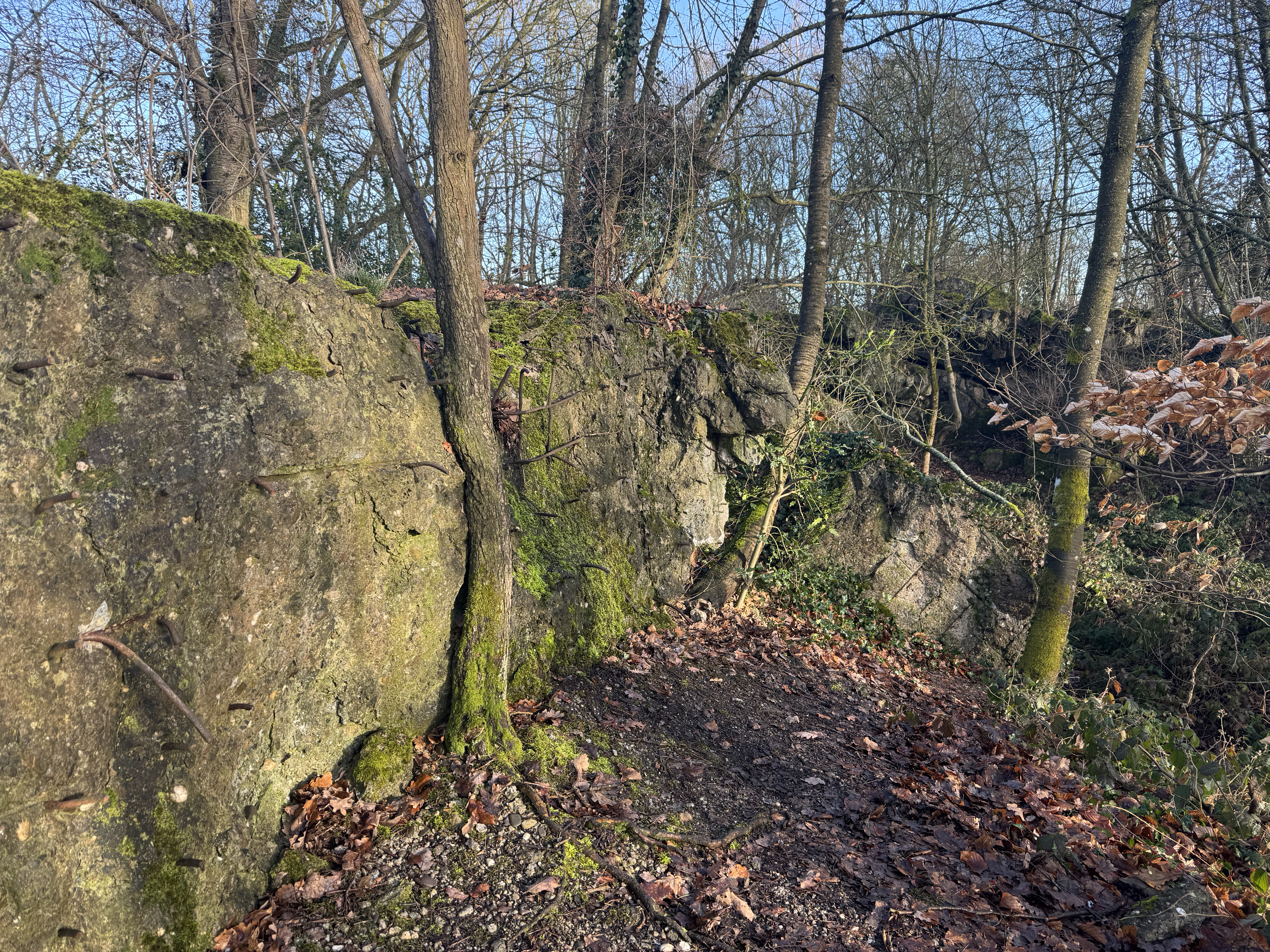
Wall remains of the so-called Führer Headquarters.

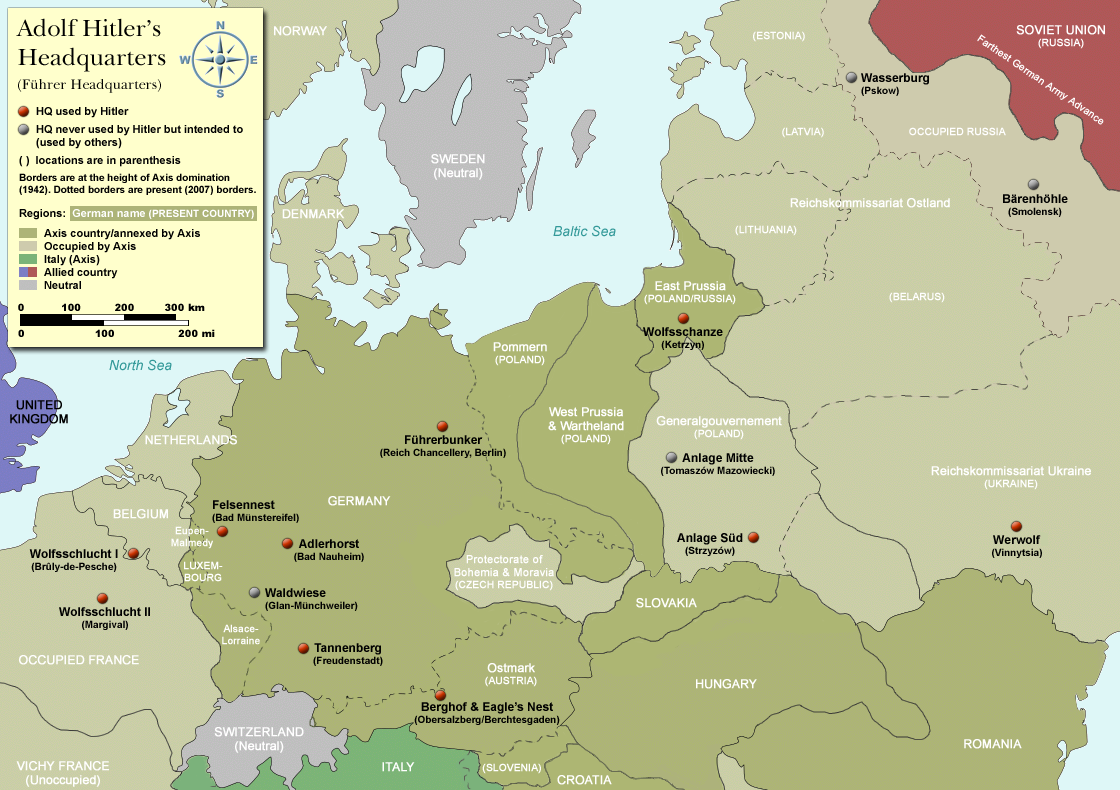
Map showing the location of Felsennest, and other Führer Headquarters throughout Europe

The Felsennest ("Rocky Eyrie" in English) was the codename for one of several Führer Headquarters used by Adolf Hitler during the course of World War II.

It was located near Bad Münstereifel, in the western part of Germany. It was much more cramped than Hitler's other headquarters, having only four rooms. Hitler was at the Felsennest in the autumn of 1939, because there were plans to invade France and the Low Countries. He was there again on May 10, 1940 when the invasion took place.

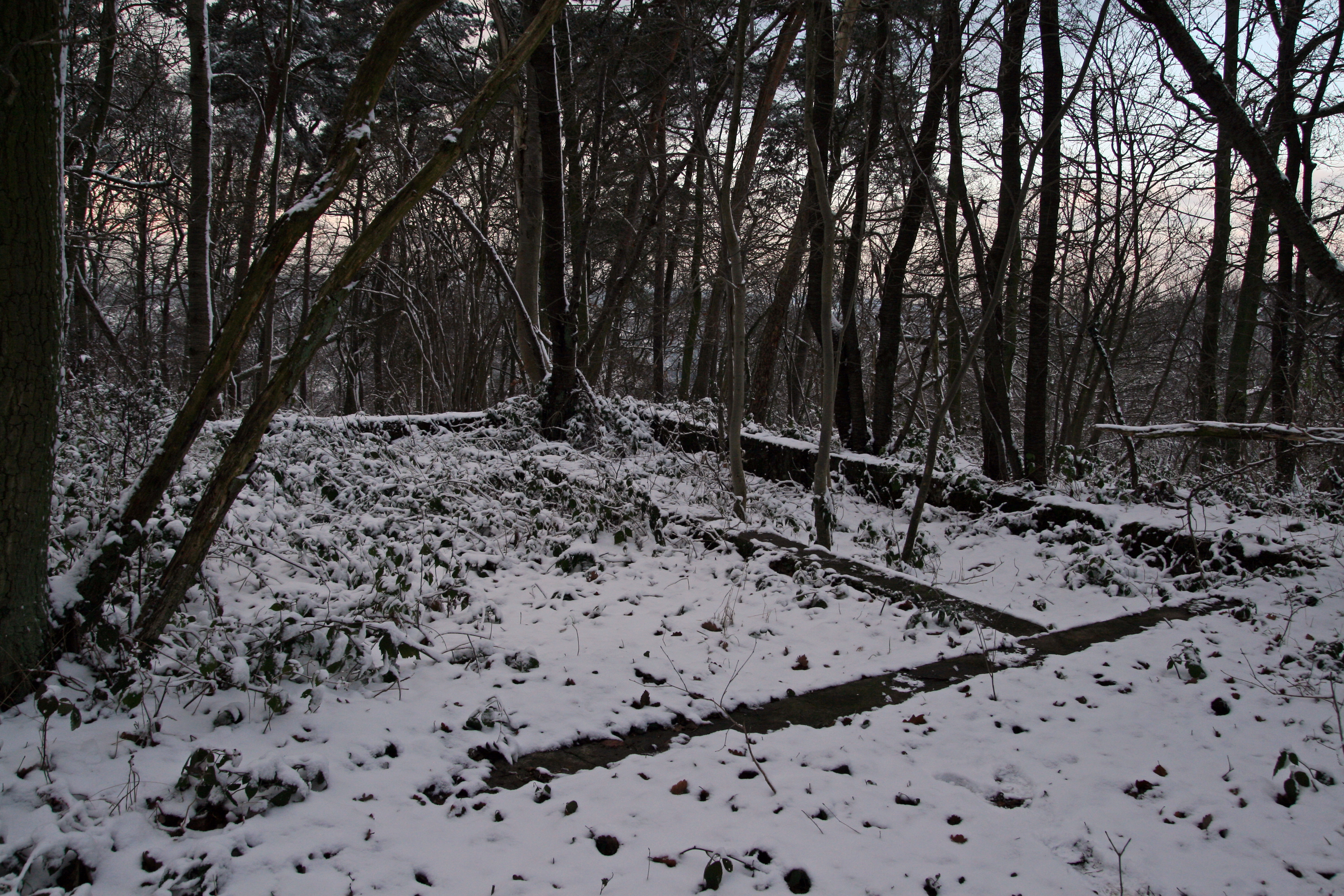
Remaining foundation of the barracks

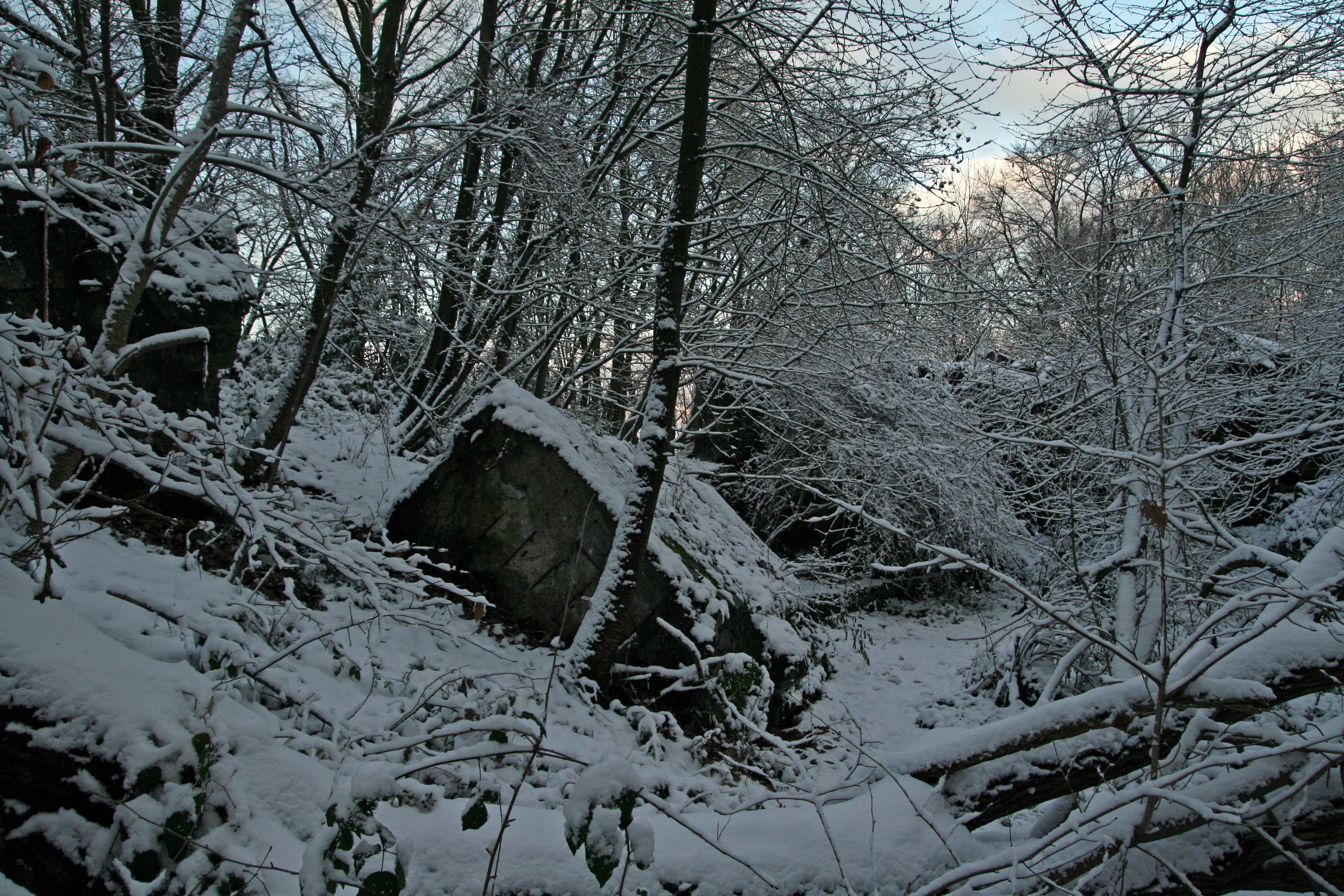
Remains of Hitler's bunker

== Literature ==
- Groß, Manfred: Bunkerstellungen der Luftverteidigungszone West im Rheinland und Hitlers Hauptquartier in Bad Münstereifel-Rodert. Verlag Werner Sünkel (Leinburg), Offenhausen 2001 (S. 67–106). ISBN 3-930060-90-6.
- Hansen, Hans-Josef: Felsennest – Das vergessene Führerhauptquartier in der Eifel. Bau, Nutzung, Zerstörung. Helios, Aachen 2008, 2. erweiterte Neuauflage (umfangreiche Dokumentation über das erste ortsfeste Führerhauptquartier des Zweiten Weltkrieges mit zahlreichen historischen und aktuellen Aufnahmen sowie Zeitzeugenberichten). ISBN 3-938208-21-X.
- Kuffner, Alexander: Zeitreiseführer Eifel 1933–1945. Taschenbuch. Seite 32–38. Helios, Aachen 2007, ISBN 978-3-938208-42-7.
- Raiber, Richard: The Führerhauptquartier – Guide to Hitler´s Headquarters (After the Battle, Nr. 19), London 1977.
- TV-Dokumentation: Hitlers Führerhauptquartiere von Rudolf Sporrer. Bayerischer Rundfunk 2003.

== See also ==
- Führer Headquarters
