= National Museum of the History of Ukraine =

History museum in Kyiv, Ukraine

Coordinates: 50°27′30″N 30°30′58″E

- Національний музей історії України

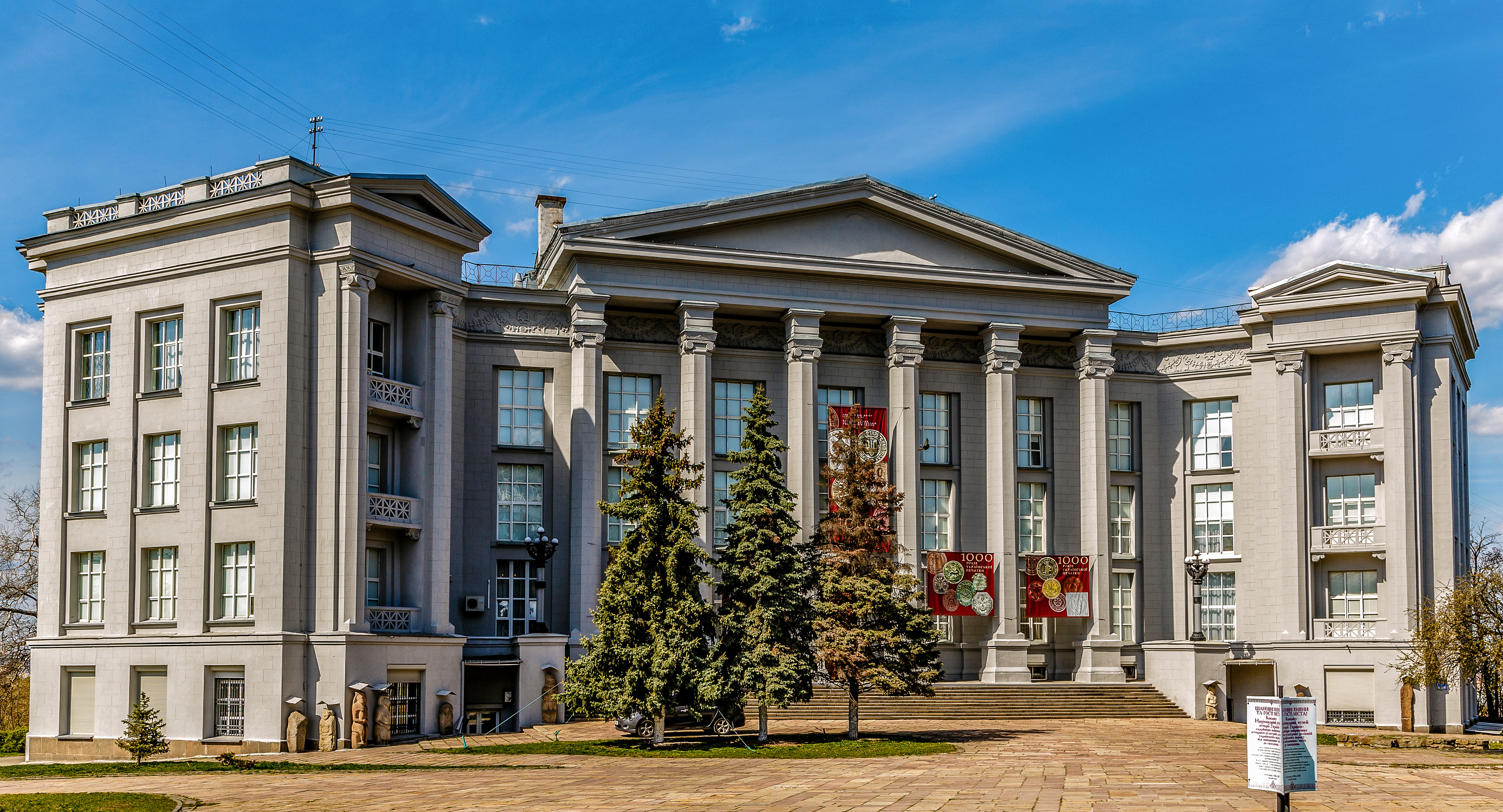
- Established: 1899
- Location: 2 Volodymyrska Street Kyiv, Ukraine
- Type: History museum
- Collection size: 800 000
- Director: Olena Zemliana
- Website: nmiu.org

The National Museum of the History of Ukraine (stylized MIST, Ukrainian: Національний музей історії України, romanized: Natsionalnyi muzei istorii Ukrainy) illustrates Ukraine's history from ancient times to the present. It is one of the leading museums in Ukraine. It holds about 800,000 items in its collection, and usually has approximately 22,000 items on permanent display. The museum holds world-famous archaeological, numismatic, ethnographic and weapons collections, examples of decorative and applied arts, manuscripts, prints, paintings and drawings, as well as relics of the Ukrainian national liberation movement of the 20th century.

== History ==
=== Foundation ===
The museum began its activities with an archaeological exhibition in Kyiv in 1899 as the Museum of Antiquities and Arts. It was housed in the unfinished building designed by the prominent architect Vladyslav Horodetsky. Funds for it were raised by Kyiv residents.

The archeological department was the first to be created in the museum. It was headed by the well-known Ukrainian archaeologist Vikentiy Khvoyka.

Mykola Biliashivsky was the first museum director, from 1902. Bilyashivsky played an extremely important role in forming the museum's collections.

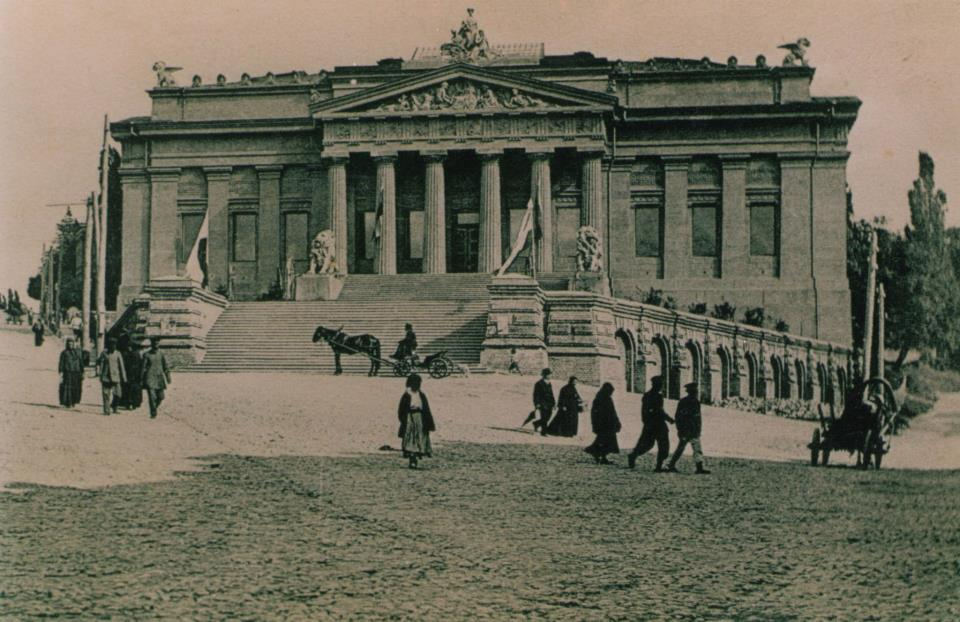
The Kyiv Art, Industry and Science Museum (now National Art Museum), 1904

In 1904 the museum was opened as the Emperor Nicholas II Kyiv Art, Industry and Science Museum.

The museum was supported by patrons, including the Tereshchenko and Khanenko families. They financed archaeological expeditions and helped to create collections with historical and ethnographic artefacts. The museum received new objects of applied art and coin collections as donations yearly.

Museum collections were significantly increased by Danylo Shcherbakivsky. He was the head of the historical and ethnographic departments. The beginning of the First World War was a new stage for the museum. It remained open throughout the war, attracting visitors and growing its collection.

=== Ukrainian War of Independence and the Soviet Period ===
The ideological and educational role of the museum significantly increased during Ukrainian War of Independence in 1917–1921.

The capture of Ukraine by the Bolsheviks led to the nationalization of cultural institutions. In 1919 soviet authorities declared the Kyiv Art, Industry and Science Museum state property and renamed it the First State Museum. Museum funds were increased, mainly by the nationalization of private collections.

In 1924 the museum was renamed to the Taras Shevchenko Ukrainian Historical Museum. The museum exposition consisted of archaeological artefacts, household items and art. Also the museum had the graduate school, where art, archaeology and ethnography specialists studied.

In 1934 the museum was evicted from its original premises. Only the art and industrial departments remained at the same site. Two years later they formed the new State Ukrainian Museum, now the National Art Museum of Ukraine. All other exhibits were transported to the Kyiv Pechersk Lavra. It's the ancient monastery, where soviet authorities made the centre of antireligious propaganda. Funds of different museums were transported there, and it was called the Museum Town.

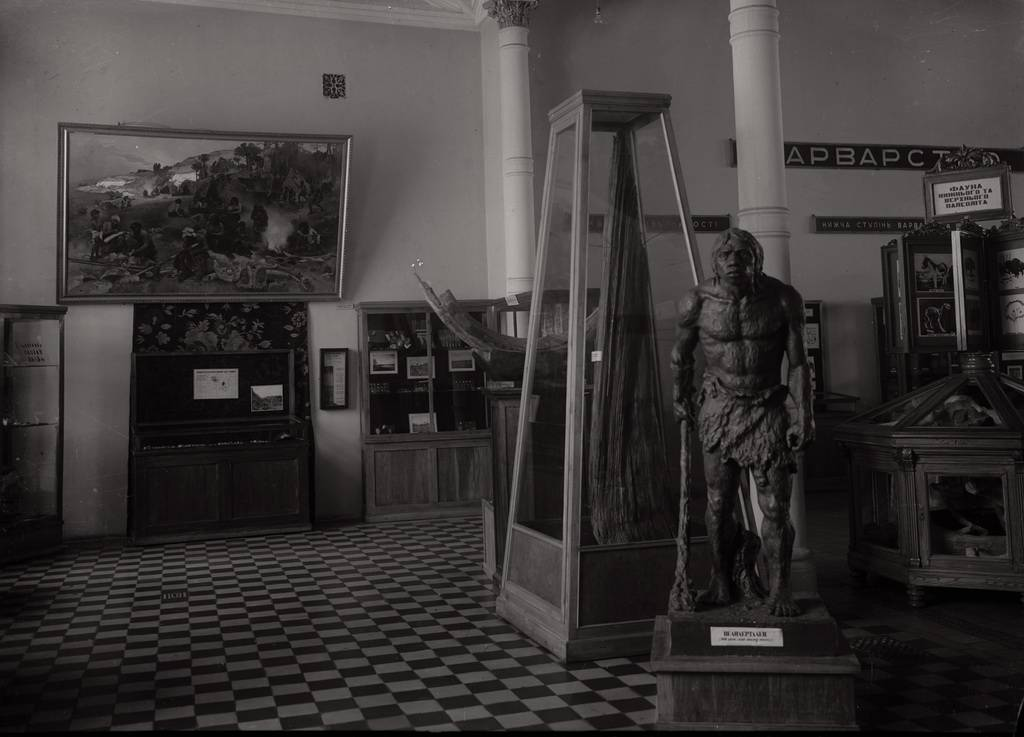
Exposition of the Taras Shevchenko Central Historical Museum

In 1935 the museum was renamed as the Taras Shevchenko Central Historical Museum. It worked at the territory of the Kyiv Pechersk Lavra.

The museum was evacuated to Bashkir Nesterov Art Museum in Ufa when the USSR was attacked by Nazi Germany during the Second World War. Although some exhibits remained in Kyiv. The evacuated collection returned to Kyiv in 1944.

At the end of 1941 with the occupation of Kyiv by Nazi forces the museum was under the Reichsleiter Rosenberg Taskforce. Its staff, including Hungarian archaeologist Nandor Fettich, packed the collections located in Kyiv Pechersk Lavra to remove it to Germany. In 1942 the archaeological and ethnographic collections of the museum were moved to the building which is now known as the Teacher's House. The museum of pre- and early history was made there.

Some of the most valuable museum artefacts from Kyiv were transported to Germany in 1941 and 1943. Most of them were trapped in Hochstedt Castle. After the fall of Nazi Germany, it was under American authority. Collections from Kyiv were sent to the Munich Central Collecting Point. Artefacts returned to Kyiv in 1947.

With the liberation of Kyiv by the Soviet Army in November 1943 the museum started to resume its work. In May 1944 it received the building where it is presently situated. It was a former arts school designed by Joseph Karakis. The museum opened for visitors in 1948.

A significant number of unique exhibits were lost during the war. The museum replenished its collections from numerous expeditions to the military fronts, archaeological and ethnographic expeditions. Also it made exhibits exchanges with Lviv, Odessa, Chernihiv, other Kyiv museums.

In 1977 the museum renewed its exposition. Design was very modern for those times. Such room planning with little changes is preserved nowadays.

The museum's collections became the basis for the other museums. In particular, 18,000 items were transferred to the National Museum of the History of Ukraine in the Second World War. The Kyiv Fortress (historical and architectural complex where the museum was created) firstly was the branch of the historical museum. About 600 exhibits were donated to the Kyiv History Museum.

During the "Brezhnev stagnation" period the museum staff also worked on popularizing the accomplishments of the Soviet state, what the USSR's described as the achievements of socialism, and glorified the leading role of the Communist party of the Soviet Union.

=== Post-independence ===
The museum was renamed as the National Museum of History of Ukraine in 1991. It has since mounted exhibitions about the Trypillia culture, the Church of the Tithes, the Holodomor, and the history of jewellery in Ukraine. In 2008 the museum put on the exhibition "Ukraine – Sweden: At the Crossroads of History (XVII-XVIII Centuries)". Items have been loaned for exhibitions held in Denmark, the Netherlands, Switzerland, Germany, Austria, France, Italy, the UK, USA, Canada, Japan, Singapore, and South Korea.

In 2020 the museum was rebranded as MIST. Formed from a combination of the words "museum" and "historical", the term in Cyrillic letters is the Ukrainian word міст ("bridge"). The rebranded name is intended to showcase the new path taken by the museum as a bridge between past and future, between different people and cultures.

In 2023, the museum took temporary possession of 565 ancient Scythian and Sarmatian artifacts from museums in Crimea that were on loan at the Allard Pierson Museum in Amsterdam when Crimea was invaded and unilaterally annexed by Russia in 2014, following court rulings in the Netherlands that ruled in favor of the Ukrainian state's claims to them. The artifacts are currently stored at the museum's branch in the Kyiv Pechersk Lavra. The museum stated that it would retain custody over the artifacts until the "de-occupation of Crimea".

In April 2024, 274 archaeological artifacts, including 115 coins that were smuggled out of Ukraine, went on display at the museum. Estonian border guards had intercepted these items, and Estonia subsequently repatriated them to Ukraine.

== Main building ==
The museum, under different names, was located in various building in Kyiv throughout its history, starting from 1899. The present building is located in a prominent position in historic Volodymyrska Street in Kyiv. Designed by architect Joseph Karakis, it was built in 1937–1939 to house the Shevchenko State Art School. In 1944, the art school moved and the building became the State Republican Historical Museum.

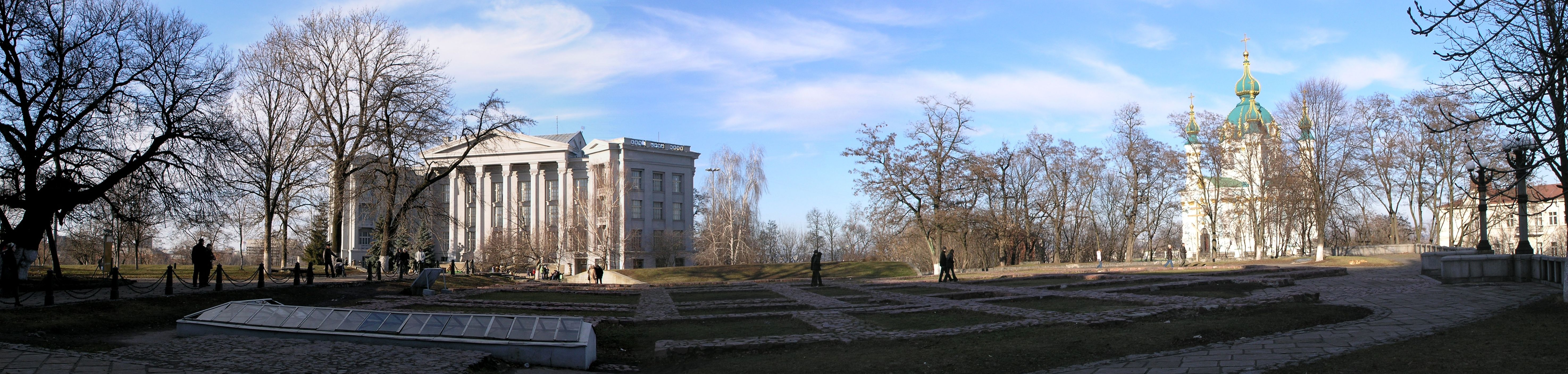

== Collection ==
The museum's collection has about 800,000 items. It include: ethnographic material, archaeological items including a significant collection of Scythian art, historical paintings and sculptures, numismatic collections, early printed books, etc.

The museum usually has 22,000 exhibits on permanent display, including permanent exhibitions that showcase finds from the territory of Ukraine. They include:

- the first primitive tools dating from a million years ago;
- the first jewellery of the Stone Age, including an ornamented mammoth tusk bracelet;
- Trypillian pottery;
- Scythian and Sarmatian weapons and horse equipment, artworks in animal style;
- ancient Greek utensils and jewels;
- silver and gold coins with trident images, a personal mark of prince Volodymyr Sviatoslavych, Baptiser of Rus;
- Rus period silver hryvnas and plinths with trident images;
- legal statutory acts and statements (universals) of hetmans;
- cossack banners and guns;
- Kyiv metropolitan bishop's carriage;
- furniture, dishes and other utensils from the 19th century.
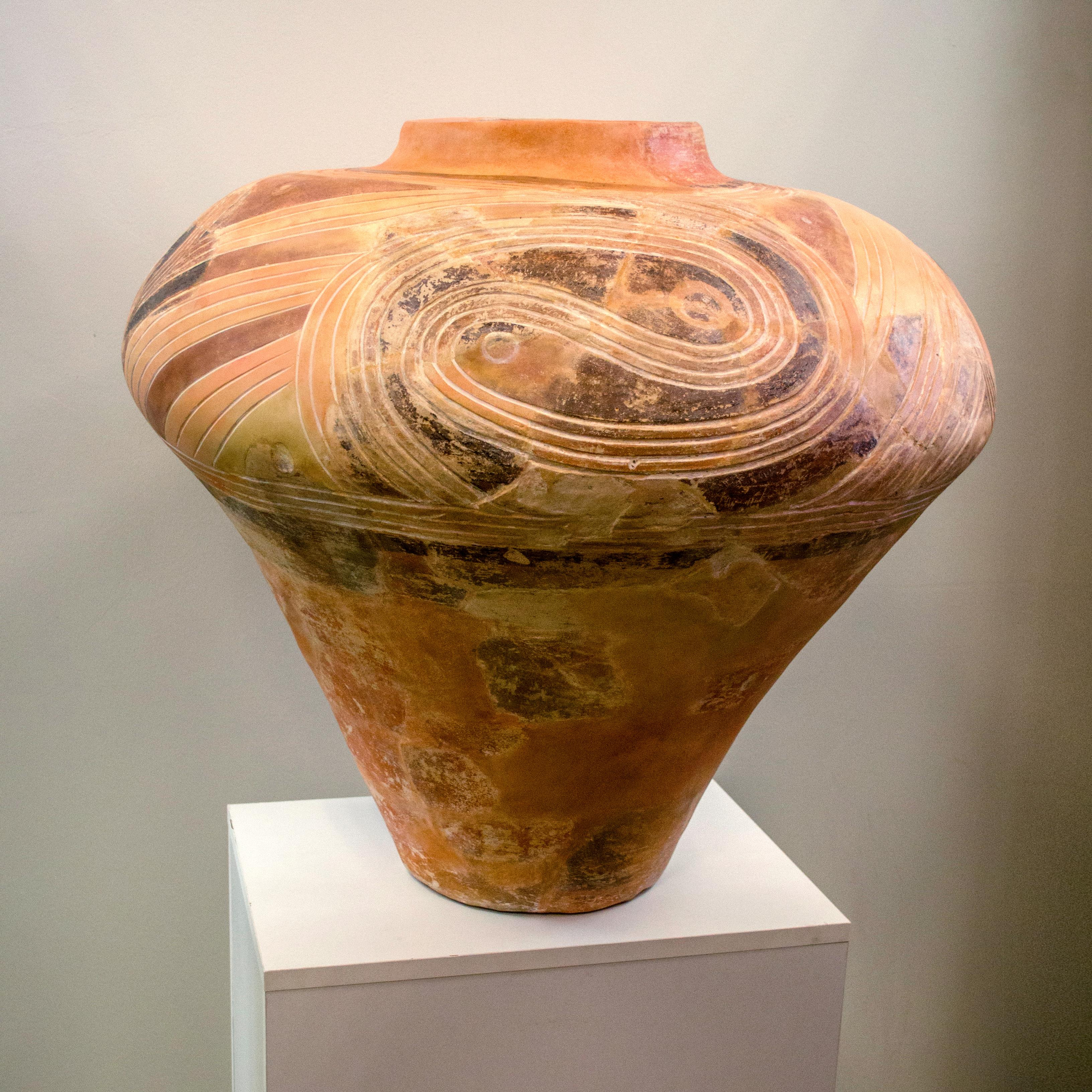

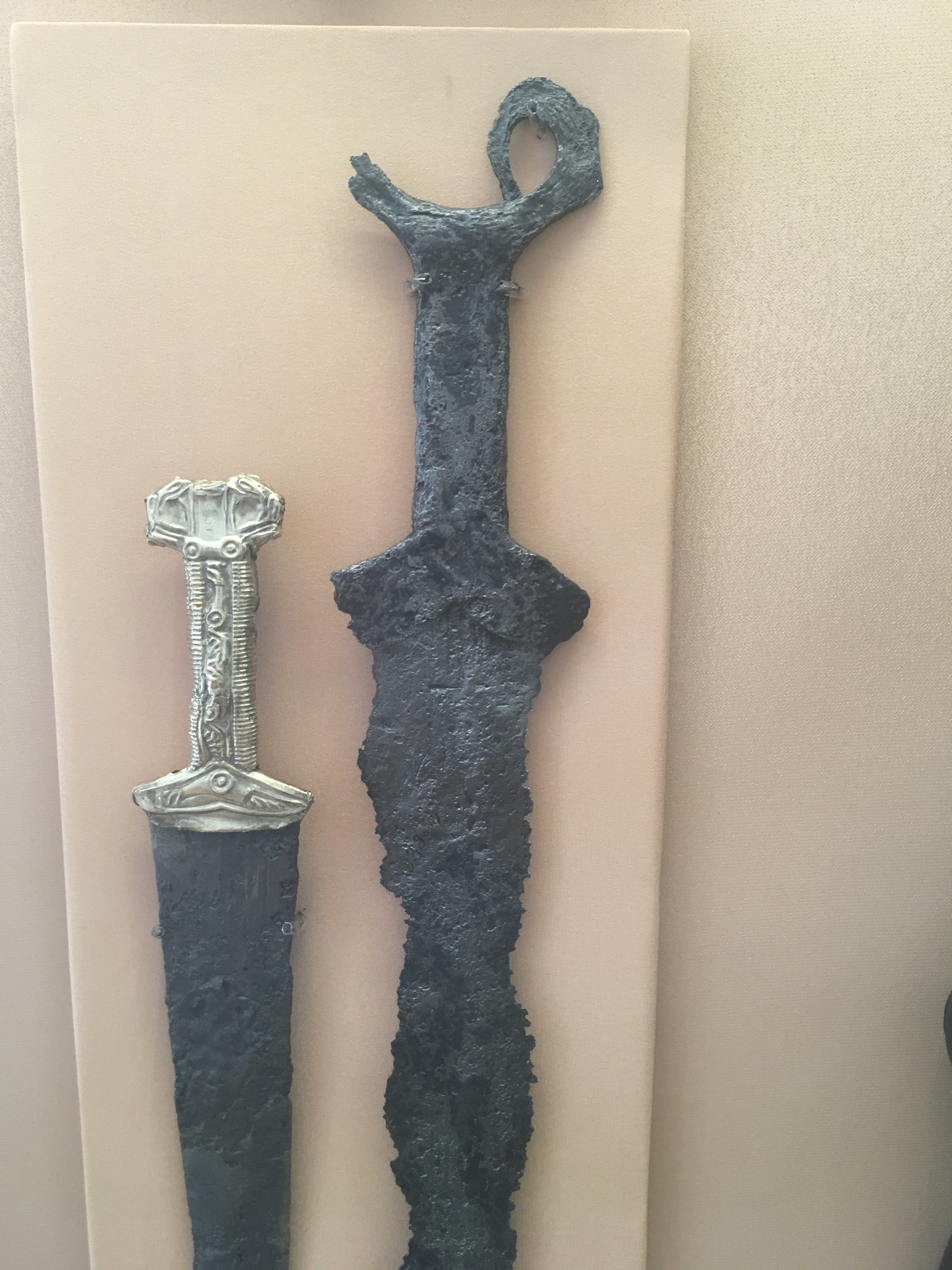

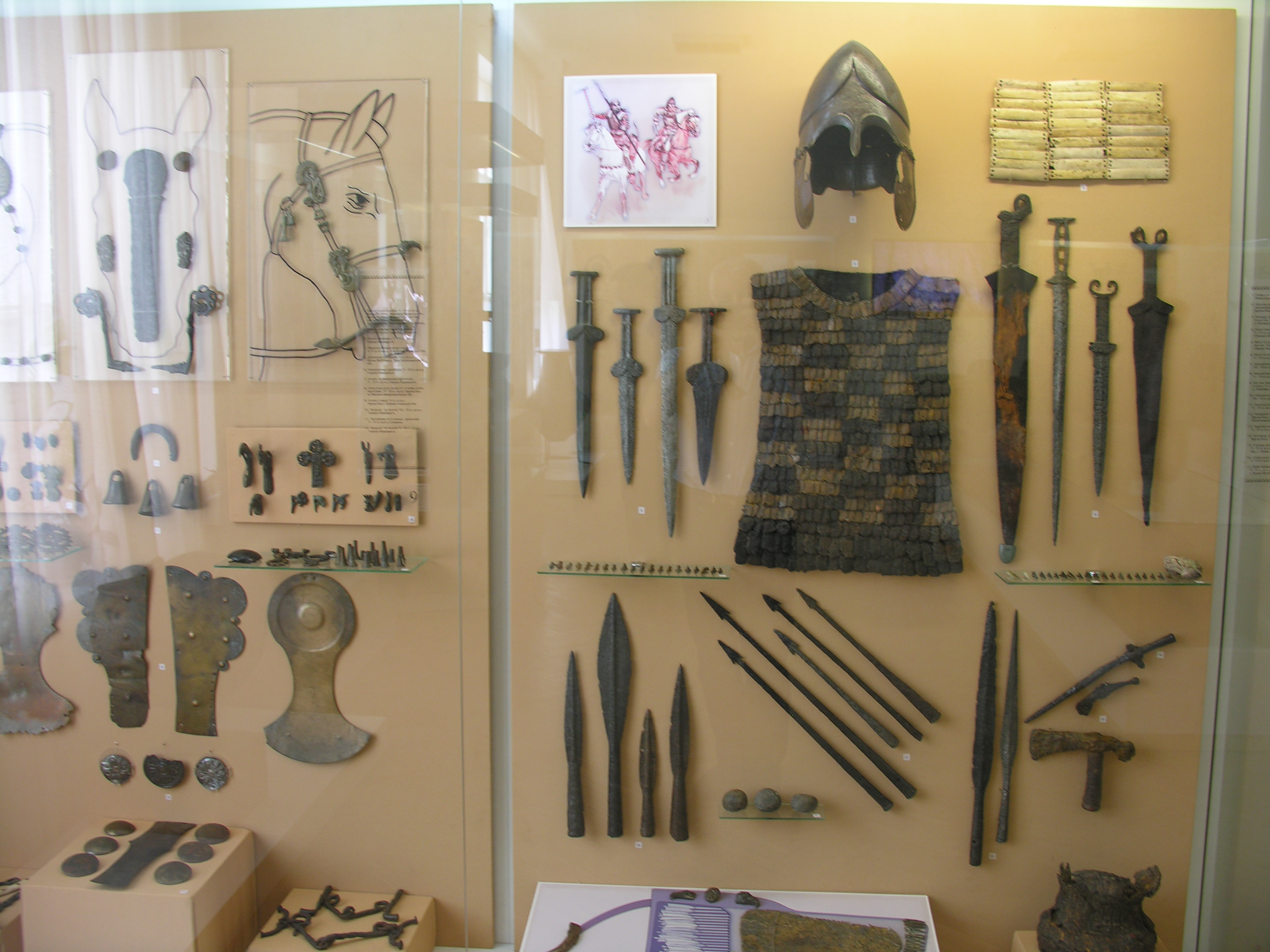

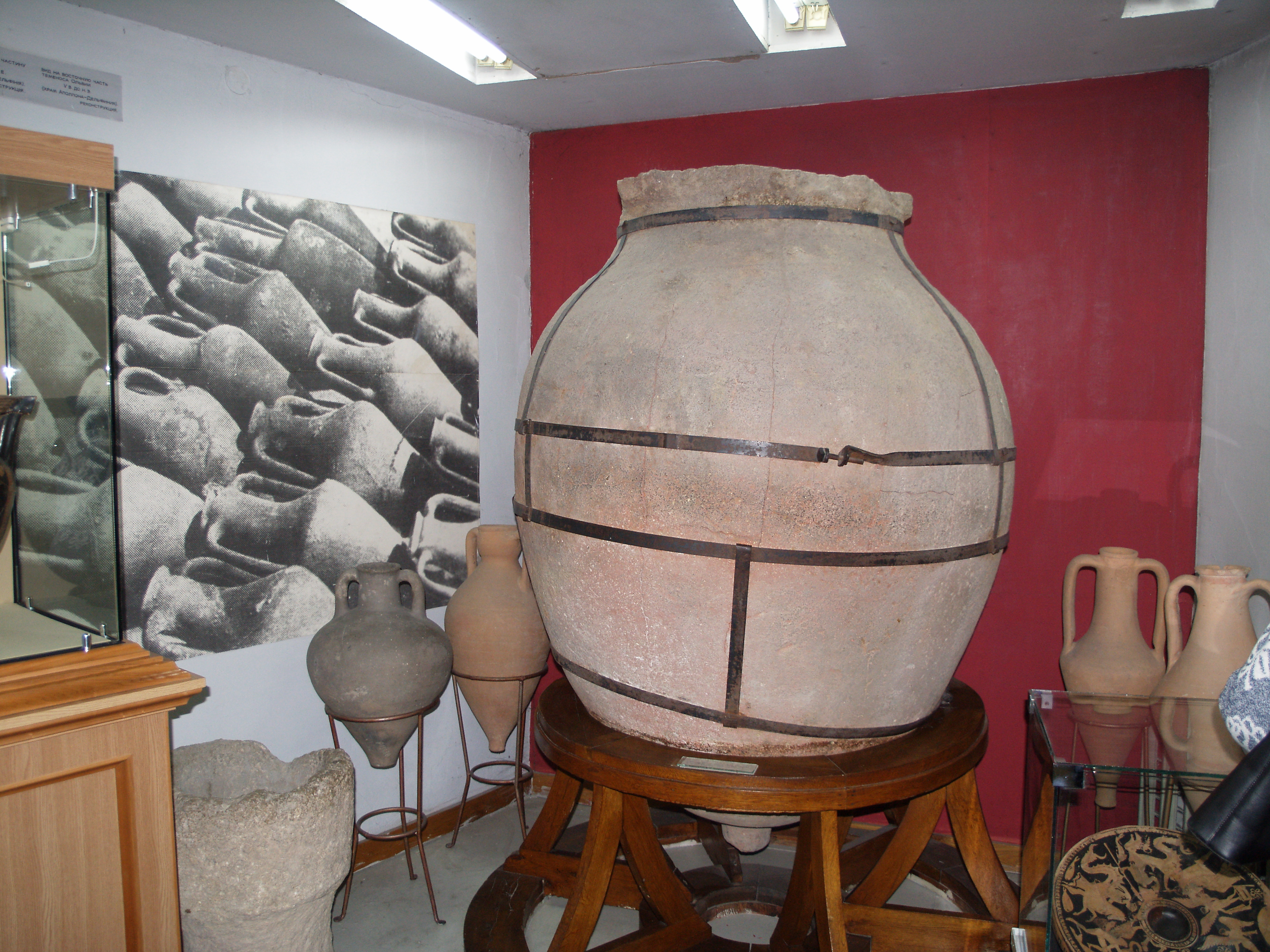

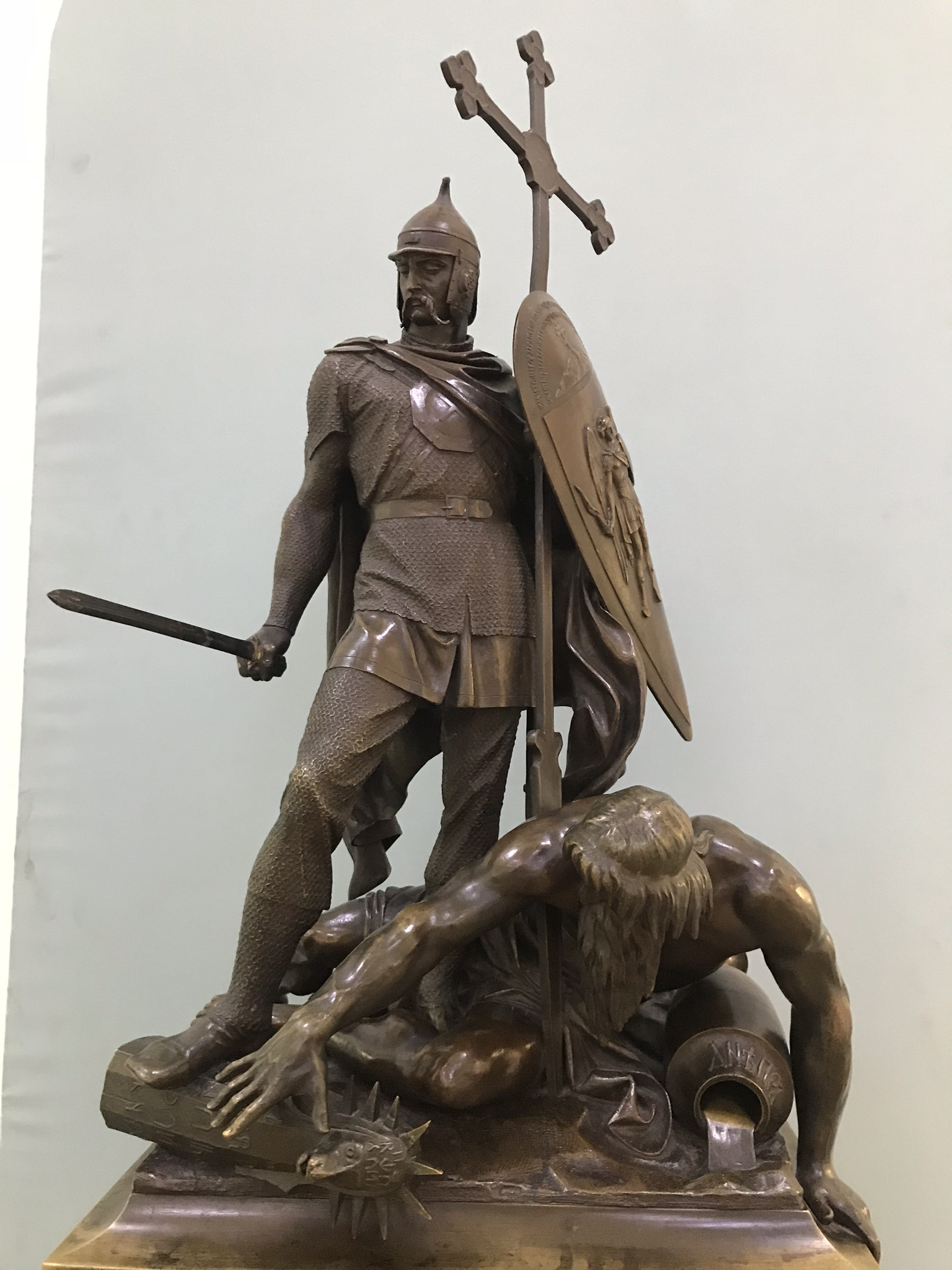

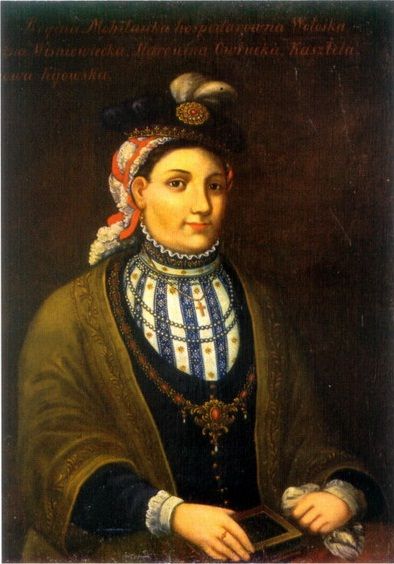

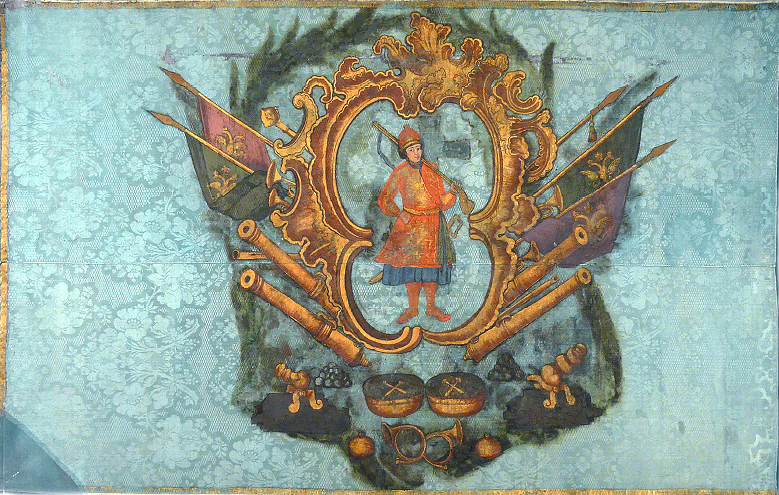

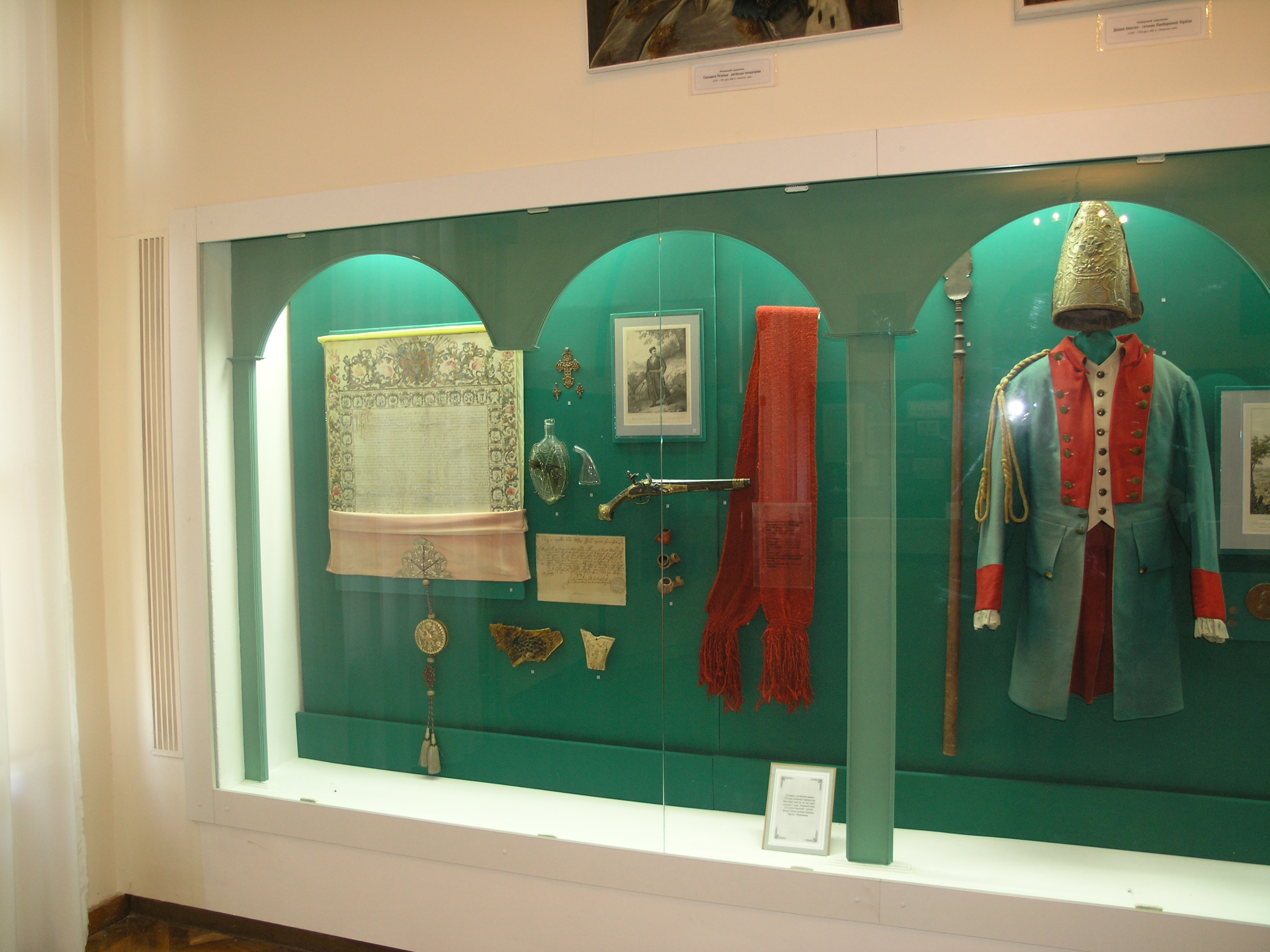

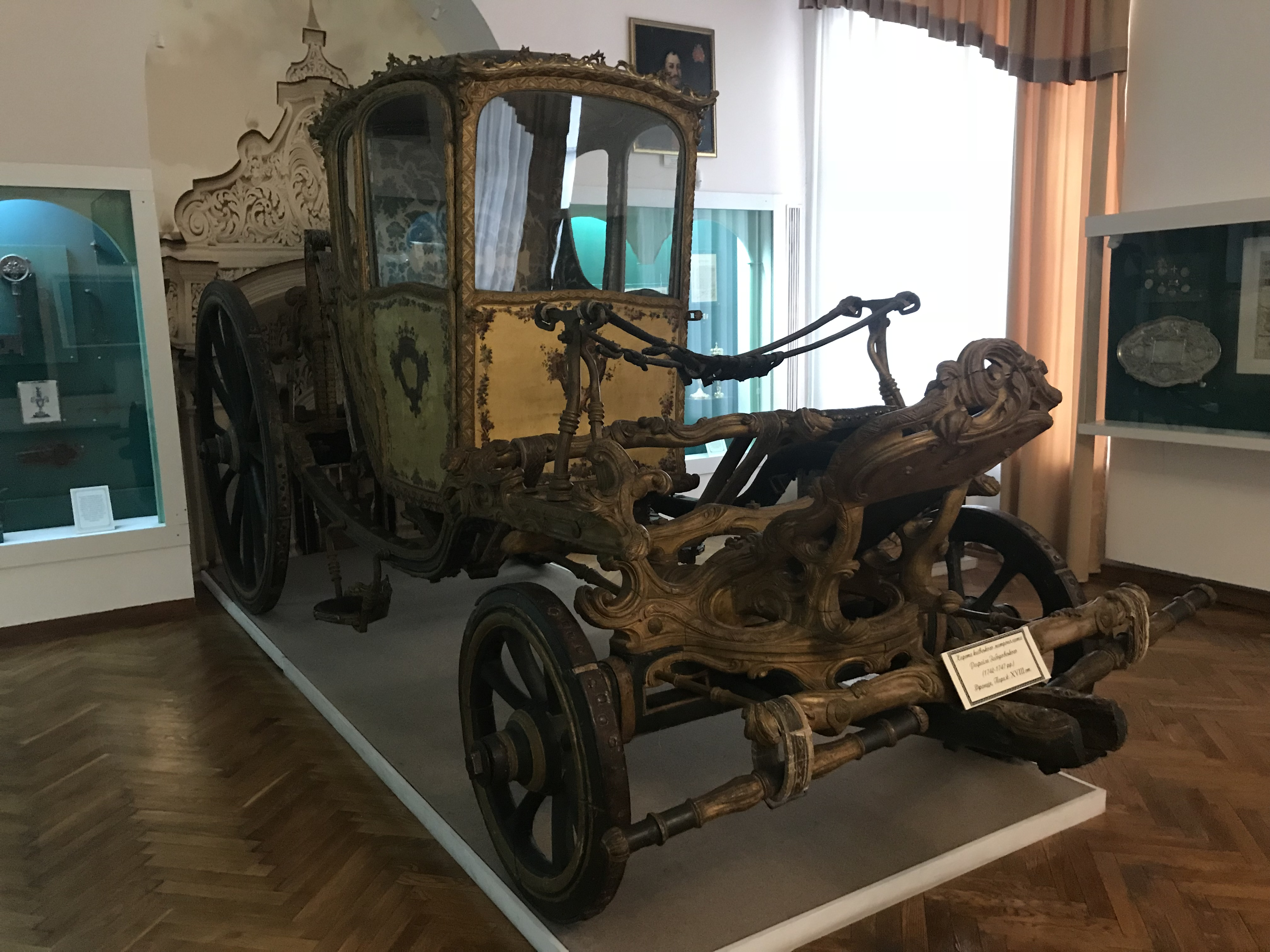

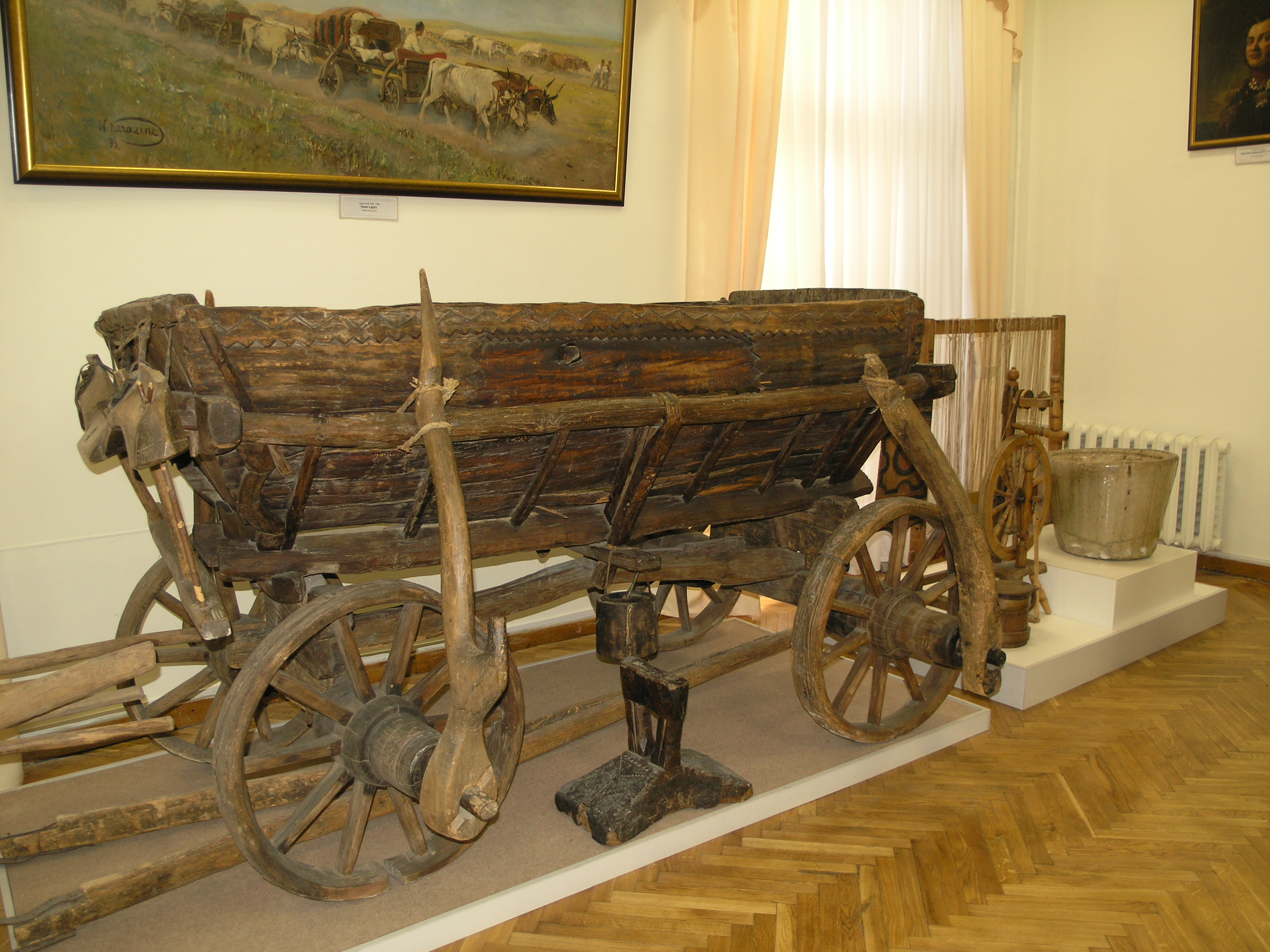

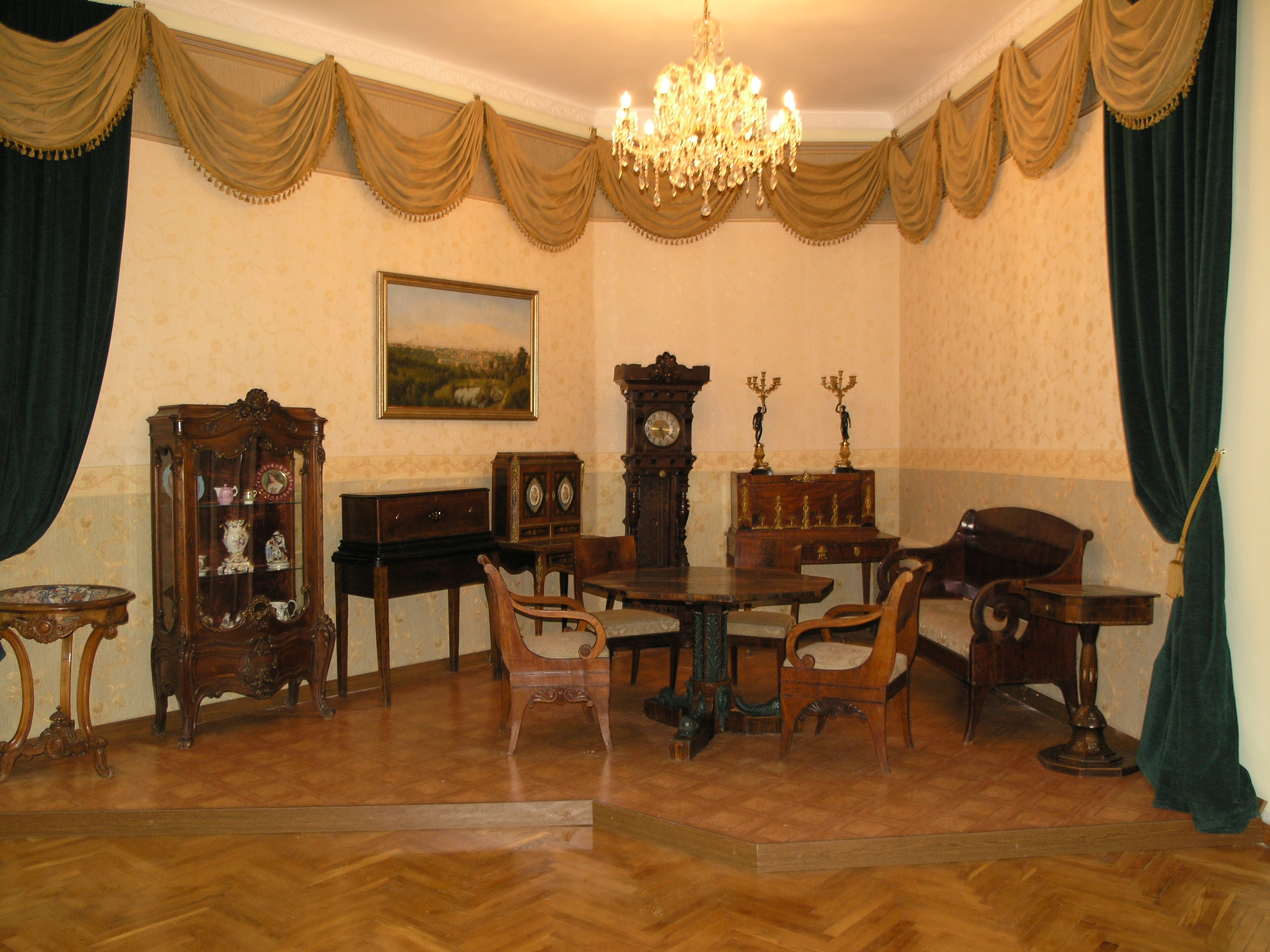

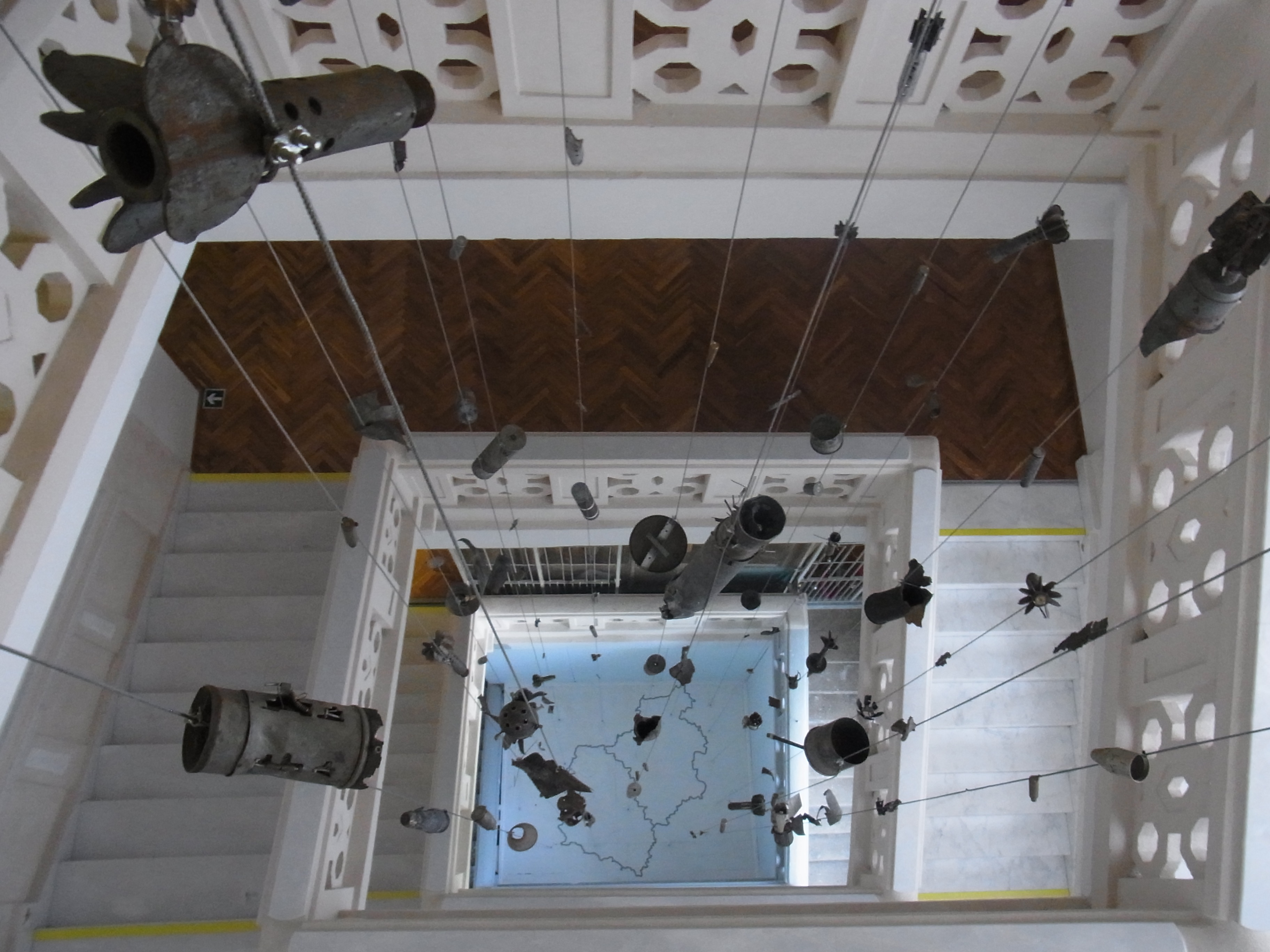

The exposition of the museum regularly hosts interactive excursions for children and adults, theatrical evening tours, author's and thematic excursions.

== Branches ==
The Kyiv City Teacher's House displays the original three statutory acts of the Central Rada, and documents and personal items of the leaders of the Ukrainian Revolution.

The Museum of Historical Treasures of Ukraine is located within the Kyiv Pechersk Lavra complex. The museum is also called the "golden treasury of Ukraine”. It holds more than 56,000 exhibits of gold, silver and gemstones. The collections, which cover the period from the Bronze Age (3rd millennium BC) to the present, include Scythian masterpieces, works from the Kyivan Rus' period, and items created by Ukrainian jewellers from the 14th century onwards. The museum holds the Golden Pectoral from Tovsta Mohyla, and a collection of Jewish ritual silver from the 18th to the 20th century.

== See also ==
- Crimea – Gold and Secrets of the Black Sea
