= Wolf Tegethoff =

German art historian

Wolf Tegethoff (born 1953) is a German art historian, an expert on Ludwig Mies van der Rohe and currently, with Ulrich Pfisterer, director of the Zentralinstitut für Kunstgeschichte, Munich.

Tegethoff studied art history, urban design, economic history and social history at the University of Bonn and Columbia University, New York. He completed his Ph.D. dissertation on Ludwig Mies van der Rohe in 1981. From 1981 to 1987, he was an assistant professor at the Kunsthistorisches Institut of the University of Kiel. From 1987 to 1991 he was second director of the Zentralinstitut für Kunstgeschichte, Munich, and since 1991 he is director of this institute. He has been visiting professor at the universities of Bonn, Haifa and Venice. In 2000, he was appointed professor of art history at LMU Munich.

Tegethoff is married to art historian Marion Ackermann (born 1965), who was director of the Kunstmuseum Stuttgart and the Kunstsammlung Nordrhein-Westfalen, Düsseldorf and is currently director of the Staatliche Kunstsammlungen Dresden. They have two children. Two further children are from a previous relationship.

== Select publications ==
- Mies van der Rohe: The Villas and Country Houses. New York, Cambridge, Mass. 1985.
- "From Obscurity to Maturity: Mies van der Rohe's Breakthrough to Modernism". In Franz Schulze, ed., Mies van der Rohe. New York 1989, pp. 28–94.
- Im Brennpunkt der Moderne: Mies van der Rohe und das Haus Tugendhat in Brünn. Munich 1998.
- Ludwig Mies van der Rohe: the Tugendhat House. Vienna, New York 2000.
- 'Catching the spirit: Mies's early work and the impact of the "Prussian style" '. In Terence Riley and Barry Bergdoll, eds., Mies in Berlin, New York 2001, pp. 134–151.
- Nation, Style, Modernism. Cracow, Munich 2006.
- Carlo Scarpa: struttura e forme. Venice 2007.
- Ralf Kaspers: Fotografie. Düsseldorf 2009.
- Allgemeines Künsterlexikon. Associate Editor, Berlin/Boston 2018.
