= Tovsta Mohyla =

Scythian burial place

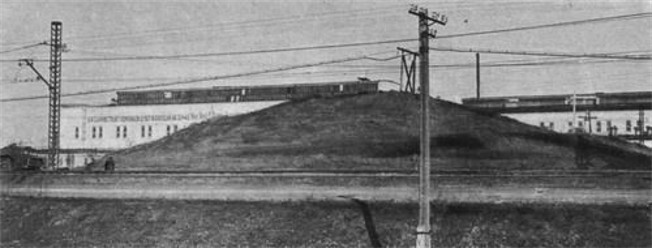
A 1970 photograph of the Tovsta Mohyla kurgan

Tovsta Mohyla (Ukrainian Товста Могила; literal meaning "fat barrow") is an ancient Scythian burial mound or kurgan. In 1971 treasure was discovered in the kugan by the Ukrainian archaeologist Borys Mozolevskyi. The site is located in southern Ukraine near the city of Pokrov, in Dnipropetrovsk Oblast.

Among the weapons, various ornaments, and items of clothing, the Golden Pectoral stood out. It is a solid 24 carat gold neckpiece, with a diameter of 12 inches (300 mm) inches and weight of just over 2.5 pounds (1.1 kg).

== History ==
Herodotus world map

The ancient Scythians were a semi-nomadic Indo-European Iranian-speaking people that lived around the northern area of the Black Sea with the territory that stretched up into the Ural Mountains and Altai Mountains regions. Their culture is thought to have lasted almost 1000 years, during which time they traded regularly with many Mediterranean and Asian cultures including the ancient Greeks, the ancient Persians and the ancient Chinese.

Classical Scythians dominated the Pontic steppe from about the 7th century BC up until the 3rd century BC.

In Ukraine, whose territory Herodotus described in his story of the Scythians, found perhaps the largest and most significant burial places of that era.

== Excavation ==
A large royal Scythian kurgan of the 4th century BC named Tovsta Mohyla was excavated in 1971 by Borys Mozolevsky. He unearthed two burial vaults of Scythian nobles. The central vault had been looted, but the side vault, dating from the later period, was intact. The central vault contained remains of a Scythian nobleman; the side vault contained five skeletons, with the main ones belonging to a Scythian noblewoman and a child.

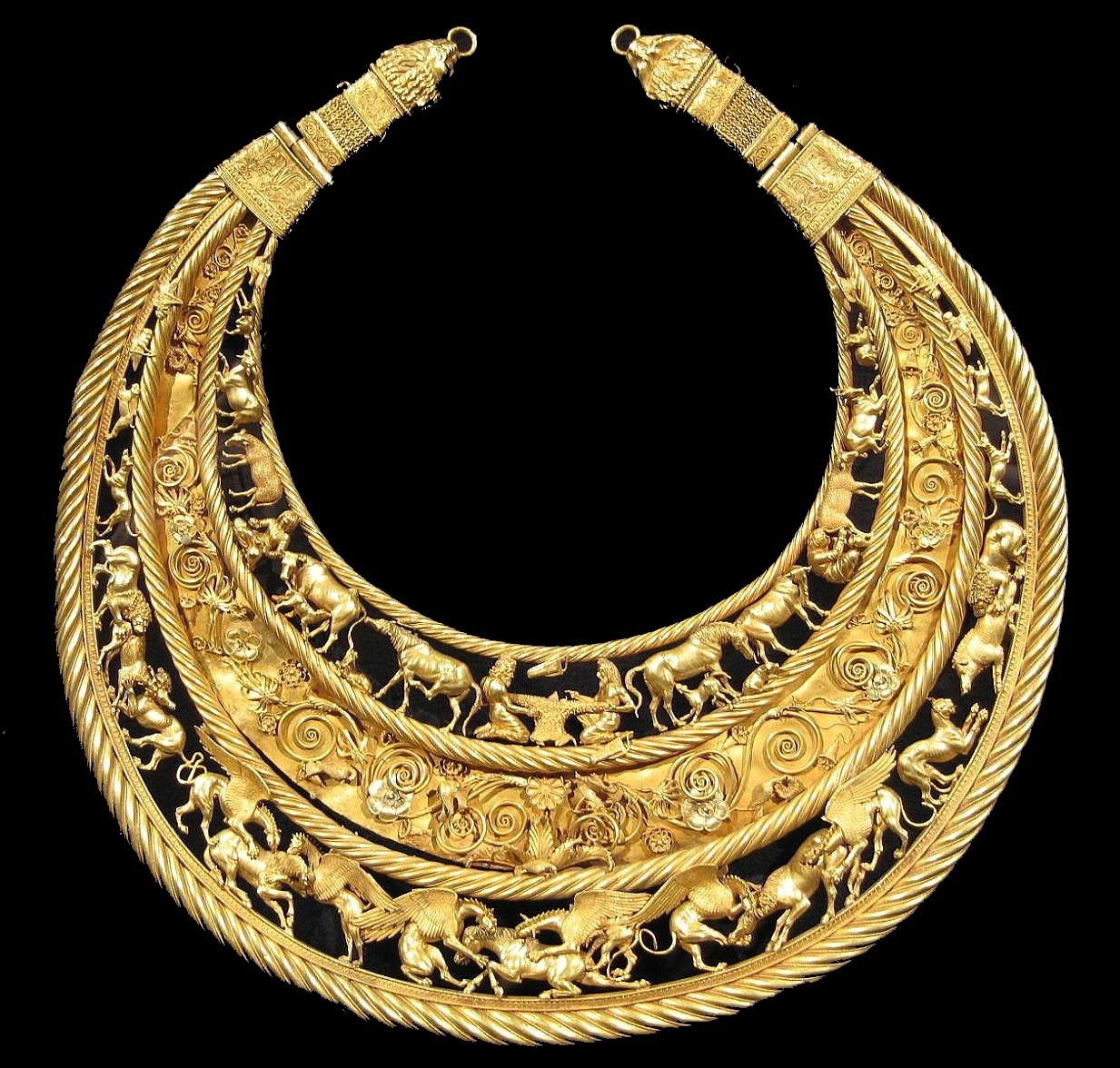
Golden Pectoral from Tovsta Mohyla

The skeletons in the mound were generously covered with gold. Among the weapons, various ornaments, and items of clothing, the Golden Pectoral stood out. The style of the ornament is certainly Greek, although the imagery reflects Scythian interests. The pectoral is made of solid 24 carat gold, with a diameter of 12 inches (30.6 cm) and weighs just over 2.5 pounds (1150 g).

To the east of the central tomb were found two horse graves with the burial of six horses. Their armor is richly decorated with gold, silver, and bronze jewelry. The horses in the afterlife world were to be served by three slain servants.

The noble dead were accompanied to the afterlife world by four slain servants. At the entrances to the grave, there were wheels from disassembled hearses, in a separate utility niche - a bronze cauldron and a frying pan. Above one of the entrance pits, a large set of bronze ornaments from a funeral procession was found. Among them are six openwork bronze tops made of the corral, decorated with stylized images of deer and griffins.

The collection is now housed at the Museum of Historical Treasures of Ukraine in Kyiv.

The finds of the Tovsta Mohyla are another convincing evidence of the high level of the material culture of the whole steppe Scythia.

Other items from the Tovsta Mohyla kurhan

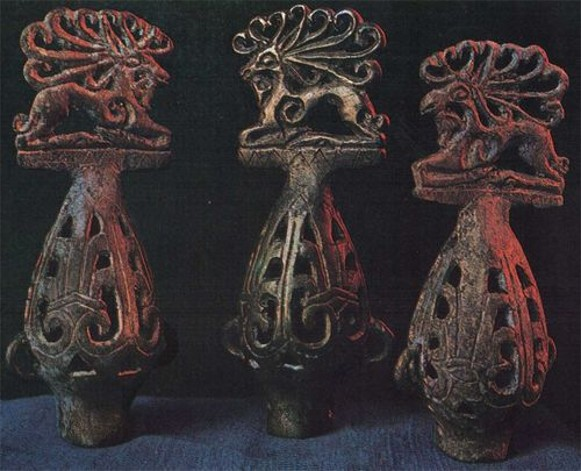
Scythian sculptures

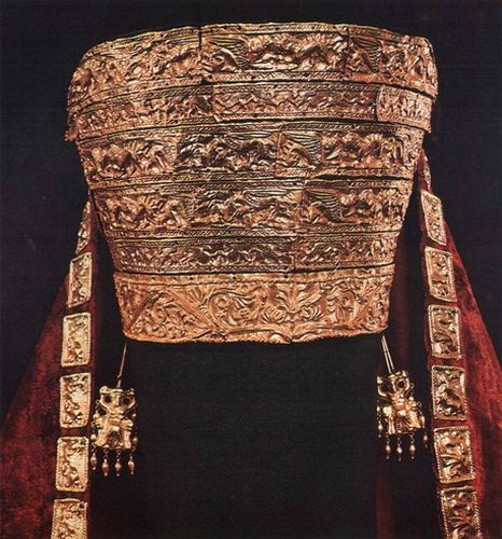
Scythian female headdress

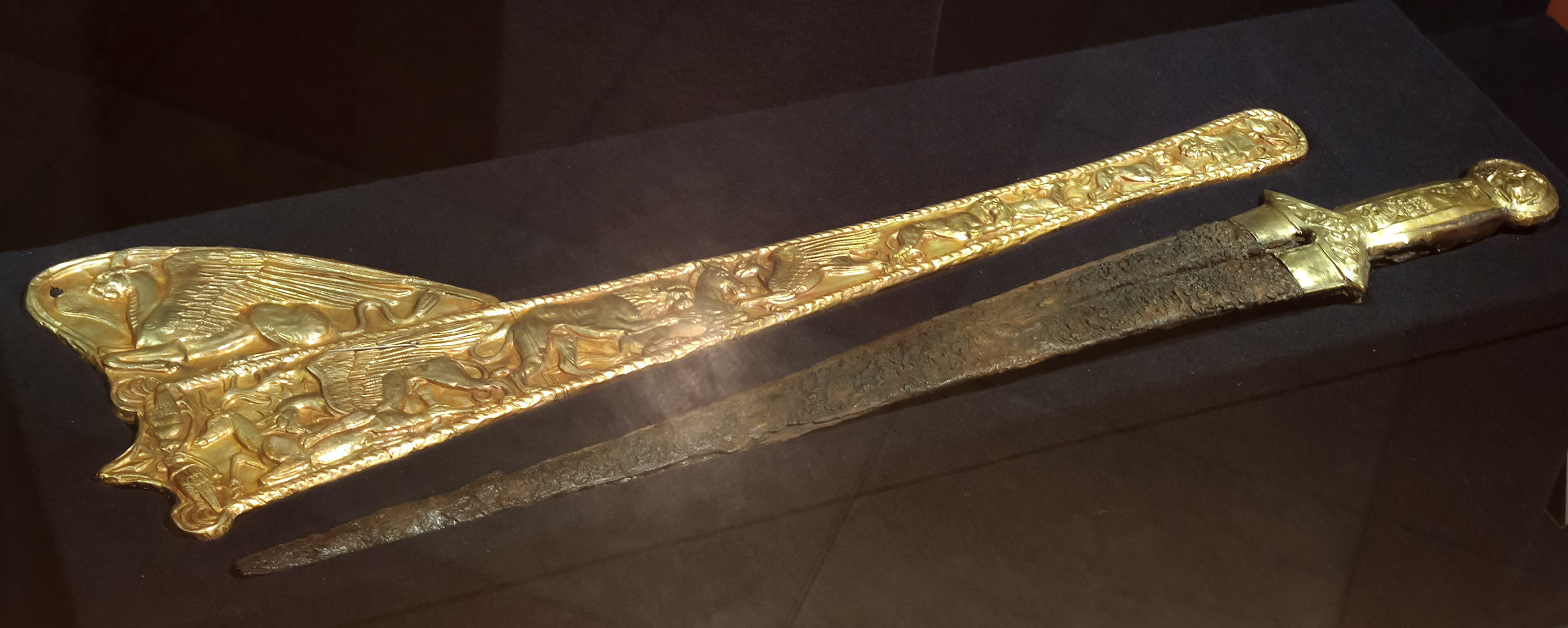
Scythian acinaces, a sword with golden sheath
