= Borys Mozolevskyi =

Ukrainian archaeologist and poet (1936–1993)

- Борис Миколайович Мозолевський
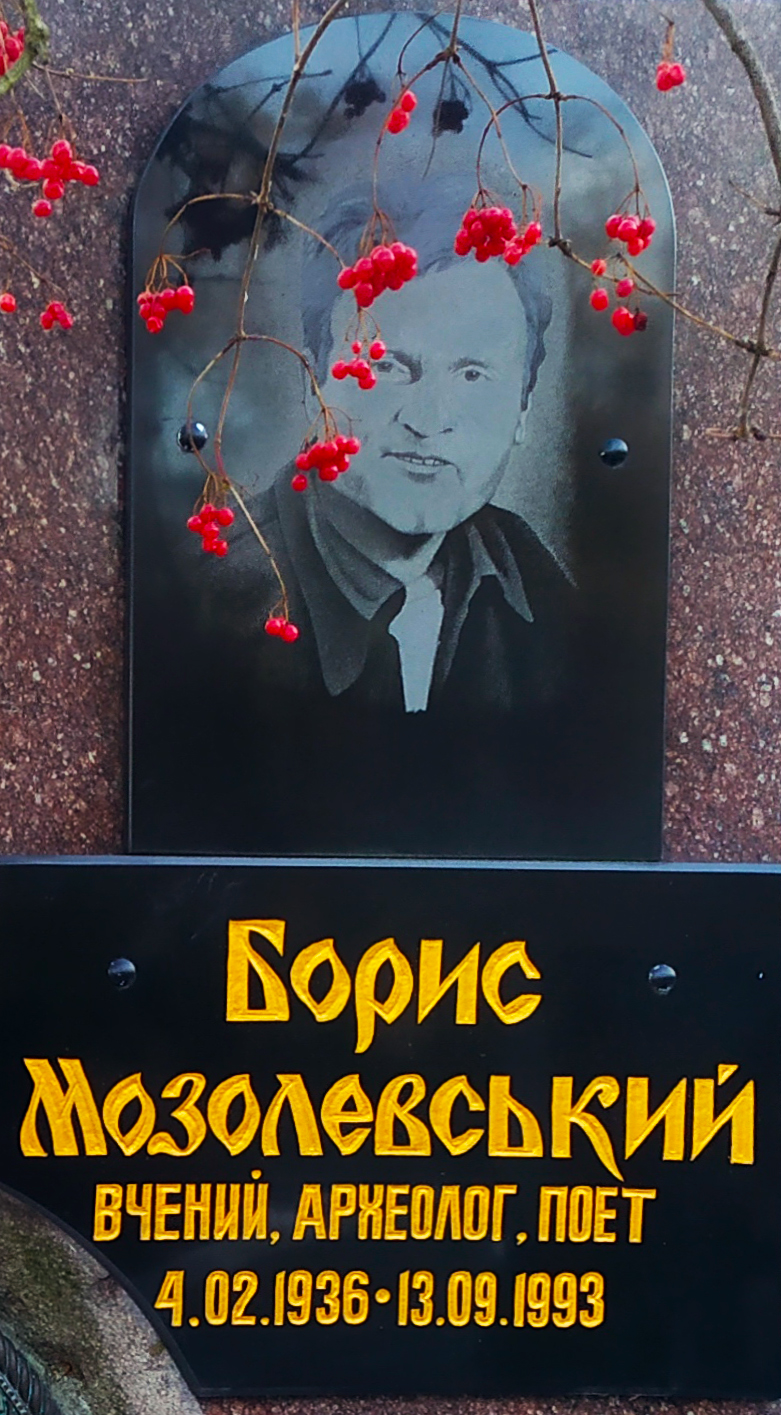
- Born: February 4, 1936; Mykolaivka, Mykolaiv Oblast, Ukrainian SSR, Soviet Union
- Died: September 13, 1993 (aged 57); Kyiv, Ukraine
- Burial place: Baikove Cemetery, Kyiv
- Education: Taras Shevchenko National University of Kyiv
- Known for: Excavations of Tovsta Mohyla; discovery of the Golden Pectoral from Tovsta Mohyla
- Spouse: Vira Danyliva Mozolevska (née Pashchenko)
- Scientific career
- Fields: Archaeology
- Workplaces: Institute of Archaeology, National Academy of Sciences of Ukraine
- Doctoral advisor: Oleksii Terenozhkin

Borys Mykolaiovych Mozolevskyi (Ukrainian: Борис Миколайович Мозолевський; 4 February 1936 – 13 September 1993) was a Ukrainian archaeologist and poet, a researcher of Scythian antiquities. He led the expedition that excavated the Tovsta Mohyla kurgan and discovered the Golden Pectoral from Tovsta Mohyla in 1971.

== Biography ==
Mozolevskyi was born into a peasant family in Mykolaiv Oblast; his ancestors were dispossessed during Soviet collectivisation, and his father died in Germany during World War II. After completing a seven-year rural school, at age fifteen he entered a special school of the Soviet Air Forces in Odesa. After that school was closed, he enrolled in the naval aviation school in Yeysk, where he studied alongside future Soviet cosmonauts Georgy Shonin and Georgy Dobrovolsky. He did not graduate, being demobilised early during the reduction of the Soviet armed forces in 1956.

After demobilisation he moved to Kyiv, where he worked for nearly ten years as a stoker. While working, he studied by correspondence at the Faculty of History and Philosophy of Kyiv University (1958–1964); from that time he began writing poetry only in Ukrainian.

In 1962 he first took part in archaeological fieldwork with the Southern Ukrainian Expedition of the Institute of Archaeology of the Academy of Sciences of the Ukrainian SSR and continued participating in fieldwork in 1965–1968. After university he worked as an editor at the Kyiv publishing house Naukova Dumka, editing archaeological publications. During the Brezhnev era he was forced to return to work as a stoker, where he became acquainted with Vasyl Stus.

From 1968 he worked as a freelance staff member of the Institute of Archaeology of the Academy of Sciences of the Ukrainian SSR, taking part in field studies of the kurgan group Haimanova Mohyla in Zaporizhzhia Oblast, where significant finds were made. From 1969 he headed the Ordzhonikidze Archaeological Expedition, which continued researching kurgans in the region of the Solona River and the Bazavluk and Chortomlyk rivers (right-bank tributaries of the Dnipro), prompted by expanding manganese quarrying.

In the essay The Road to Oneself (Ukrainian: «Шлях до себе»), Mozolevskyi wrote:

"And when the noose was already about to tighten around my neck, I realised that only a discovery of world significance could save me. Thus I dreamed and suffered my own Tovsta Mohyla. My audacity was rewarded with the royal pectoral. Instead of Mordovia I ended up at the Institute of Archaeology of the Academy of Sciences of the Ukrainian SSR, where they hurried to enroll me retroactively."

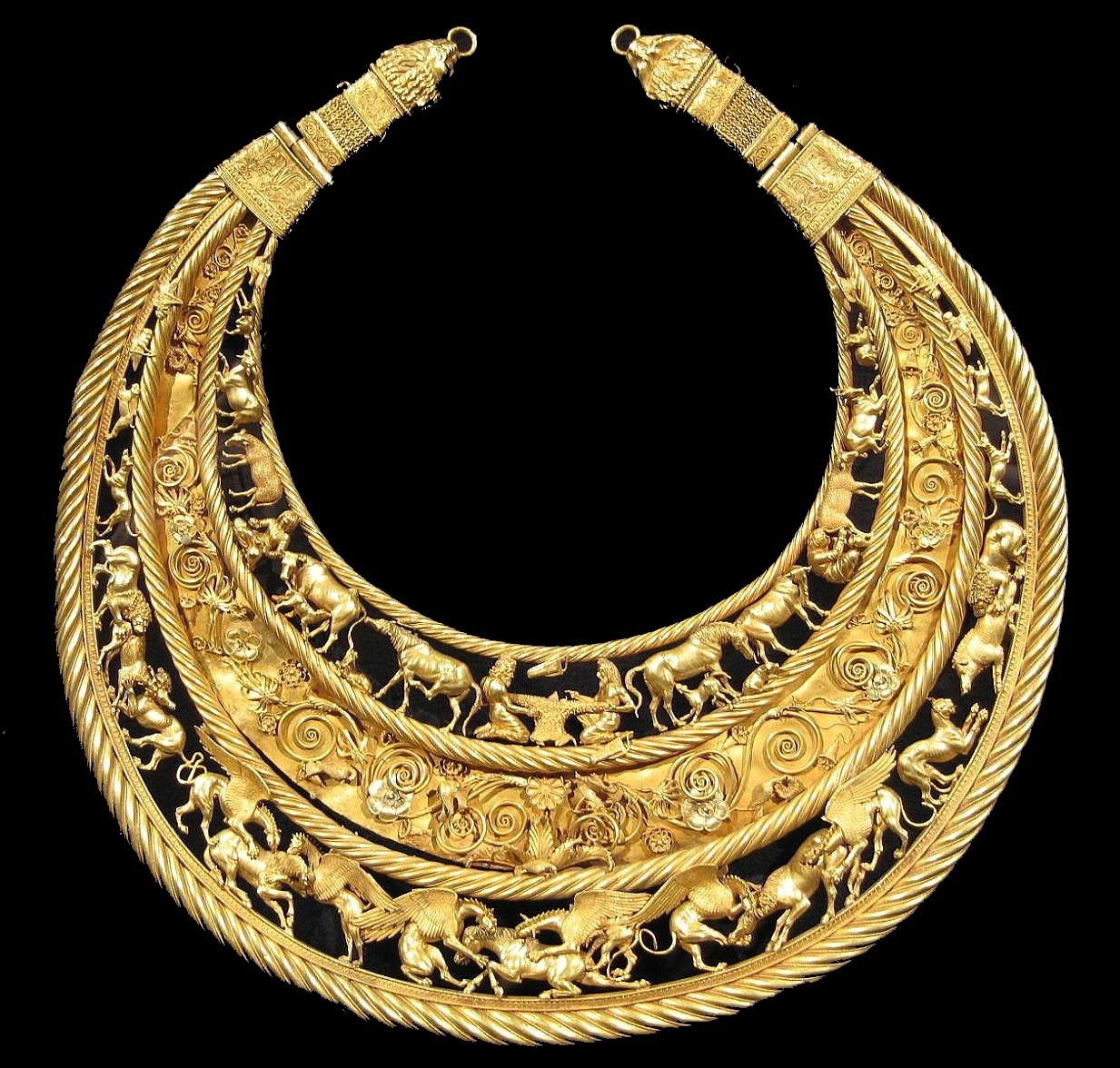
The Golden Pectoral from Tovsta Mohyla which Mozolevskyi discovered

On 21 June 1971, under his leadership, the expedition at Tovsta Mohyla made a sensational discovery: a rich Scythian burial among whose treasures was the golden pectoral now known as the Golden Pectoral from Tovsta Mohyla. According to later accounts, Mozolevskyi transported the find to Kyiv disguised under an old padded jacket and sought help from writer Oles Honchar; afterwards he was received by the First Secretary of the Communist Party of Ukraine Petro Shelest (with institute director Fedir Shevchenko and academy president Borys Paton present). As a result, Mozolevskyi became a junior research fellow at the Institute of Archaeology, received an apartment and a higher salary, and the treasure remained in Kyiv despite pressure from Moscow.

After Tovsta Mohyla, Mozolevskyi became one of the most authoritative researchers of Scythian kurgans. In 1980 he defended his Candidate of Historical Sciences dissertation on the treasures from Tovsta Mohyla; from 1986 until the end of his life he headed first a department and then the sector of Scythian archaeology at the Institute of Archaeology of the National Academy of Sciences of Ukraine. He was also admitted to the National Writers Union of Ukraine.

Years of fieldwork helped Mozolevskyi develop criteria for visually identifying Scythian kurgans without excavation. During surveys in 1984–1985 and 1989 across Mykolaiv, Kirovohrad, Dnipropetrovsk, Zaporizhzhia, Kherson and Crimea regions, he inspected more than sixty kurgans over 8 metres in height and identified twenty-three royal Scythian kurgans among them.

A special place in his research is held by the excavation of the Soboleva Mohyla kurgan in summer 1991, where a rich burial (including a Scythian priest and two children) was found at a depth of about 10 metres. Mozolevskyi planned to synthesise these finds in a doctoral dissertation, but these plans were thwarted by a severe illness (cancer).

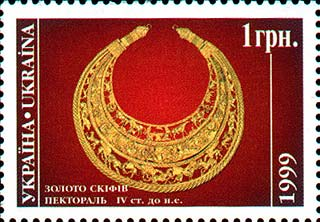
Postage stamp of Ukraine depicting the Golden Pectoral from Tovsta Mohyla discovered by Mozolevskyi

In 1993 he received the commemorative "Golden Scythian" diploma of the Institute of Archaeology and the Council of the Kyiv Academy of Eurobusiness. He died on 13 September 1993 and was buried at Baikove Cemetery in Kyiv.

After his death, friends recalled that he repeatedly said: "Gold is pressing on me... It is choking me." He also complained that on dark nights a witch-priestess from "Soboleva Mohyla" knocked at his window.

== Poetry ==
In addition to scholarly works, Mozolevskyi left a substantial body of poetry. He began writing verse in childhood. His first poetry collection, Начало марта (Beginning of March), was published in 1963. In the late 1960s he began writing in Ukrainian and produced poetry books reflecting on Ukraine's history and contemporary life, including Червоне вітрило (1976), Веретено (1980), Кохання на початку осені (1985), І мить як вік (1986) and Дорогою стріли (1991).

He also wrote the lyrical novella Duma pro step (Ukrainian: «Думи про степ»), written in the 1960s; it won second prize in the closed "Yevshan-zillia" competition (1967–1968), but was not published until 1996.

In his poetry he expressed lyrical experiences and reflections on the fate of Ukraine through the prism of its historical past. He was friends with artist Mykola Trehub and kobzar Mykola Tovkailo, who were also associated with the Institute of Archaeology and contributed to science and the arts.

== Commemoration ==
- Streets named after Borys Mozolevskyi exist in Kyiv, Dnipro, Nikopol, Kramatorsk, Mykolaiv, Kherson and Kryvyi Rih.
- In Veselynove, his hometown community, the central street, a square, the district library and a district humanitarian gymnasium bear his name.
- In Pokrov there is a park named after Borys Mozolevskyi.
- The village of Mozolevske is named in his honor.

== Works ==
=== Selected scientific works ===
- Mozolevskyi, B. M. Tovsta Mohyla—an outstanding monument of Scythia // Archaeology. 1972. No. 5. pp. 72–82.
- Mozolevskyi, B. M. Synthesis of Scythian–Antique thought. Toward an interpretation of the pectoral from Tovsta Mohyla // Vsesvit. 1978. No. 2.
- Mozolevskyi, B. M. Tovsta Mohyla. Kyiv: Naukova Dumka, 1979. 251 pp.
- Mozolevsky, B. N. Scythian kurgans in the vicinity of Ordzhonikidze (Dnipropetrovsk region) // Scythia and the Caucasus. Kyiv: Naukova Dumka, 1980.
- Mozolevskyi, B. M. Scythian Steppe. Kyiv: Naukova Dumka, 1983.
- Mozolevskyi, B. M. Kurgans of the highest Scythian nobility and the problem of Scythia’s political system // Archaeology. 1990. No. 1.
- Bidzilya, V. I.; Boltryk, Yu. V.; Mozolevsky, B. N.; Savovsky, I. P. Kurgan cemetery at Nosaky // Kurgan cemeteries Riasni Mohyly and Nosaky. Kyiv: Naukova Dumka, 1977.
- Terenozhkin, A. I.; Mozolevsky, B. N. Melitopol Kurgan. Kyiv: Naukova Dumka, 1988.
- Mozolevskyi, B. M. The Sign of Scythia // Rozbudova derzhavy. 1992. No. 4.
- Mozolevskyi, B. M. Scythian Steppe. Kyiv: Tempora, 2005.

=== Poetry collections ===
==== In Russian ====
- Mozolevsky, B. Начало марта: стихи / intro by L. Vysheslavsky. Kyiv: Radianskyi pysmennyk, 1963. 105 pp.
- Mozolevsky, B. Шиповник: стихи. Kyiv: Molod, 1967. 94 pp.
- Mozolevsky, B. Зарево: стихи. Kyiv, 1971.

==== In Ukrainian ====
- Mozolevskyi, B. Веретено: поезії. Kyiv: Molod, 1980. 96 pp.
- Mozolevskyi, B. Кохання на початку осені: вірші, поеми. Kyiv: Radianskyi pysmennyk, 1985. 134 pp.
- Mozolevskyi, B. І мить як вік: поезії / foreword by V. Zabashtanskyi. Kyiv: Dnipro, 1986. 173 pp.
- Mozolevskyi, B. Дорогою стріли: поезії. Kyiv: Radianskyi pysmennyk, 1991. 159 pp.
- Mozolevskyi, B. Поезії. Kyiv: Tempora, 2007. 584 pp.
- Mozolevskyi, B. Червоне вітрило: поезії. Kyiv: Radianske pysmennyk, 1976. 102 pp.
- Mozolevskyi, B. Пектораль. Rubanivske: [publisher not given], 2011. 47 pp. (colour ill.).
