= Nikolaus von Maillot de la Treille =

Nikolaus Hubert Freiherr von Maillot de la Treille (25 September 1774 – 28 August 1834) was a Bavarian lieutenant general and War Minister under Maximilian I Joseph and Ludwig I of Bavaria.

Maillot de la Treille was born in Jülich. He joined the cadets corps of the Bavarian army in 1776, and took part in the campaigns during 1800 and 1815. During the war, his son August was born in 1803. In 1813 he became major general and brigadier, and was Bavarian military representative of the German Confederation after 1819. Forced by field-marshal Karl Philipp von Wrede and Crown Prince Ludwig, he became minister of state for the army (Staatsminister der Armee) on 30 September 1822 and was advanced to the rank of lieutenant general in 1824. In 1826 the ministerial post was renamed "war minister". He retired in 1829 and died in Munich, where he was buried in the Alter Südfriedhof.

Maillot de la Treille's manor-house at Schwabing was built by the architect Jean Baptiste Métivier.

Government offices
Preceded by Johann Nepomuk Graf von Triva	Ministers of War (Bavaria); 1822–1829	Succeeded by Georg von Weinrich
