= Golden Pectoral from Tovsta Mohyla =

4th century BC Scythian artifact

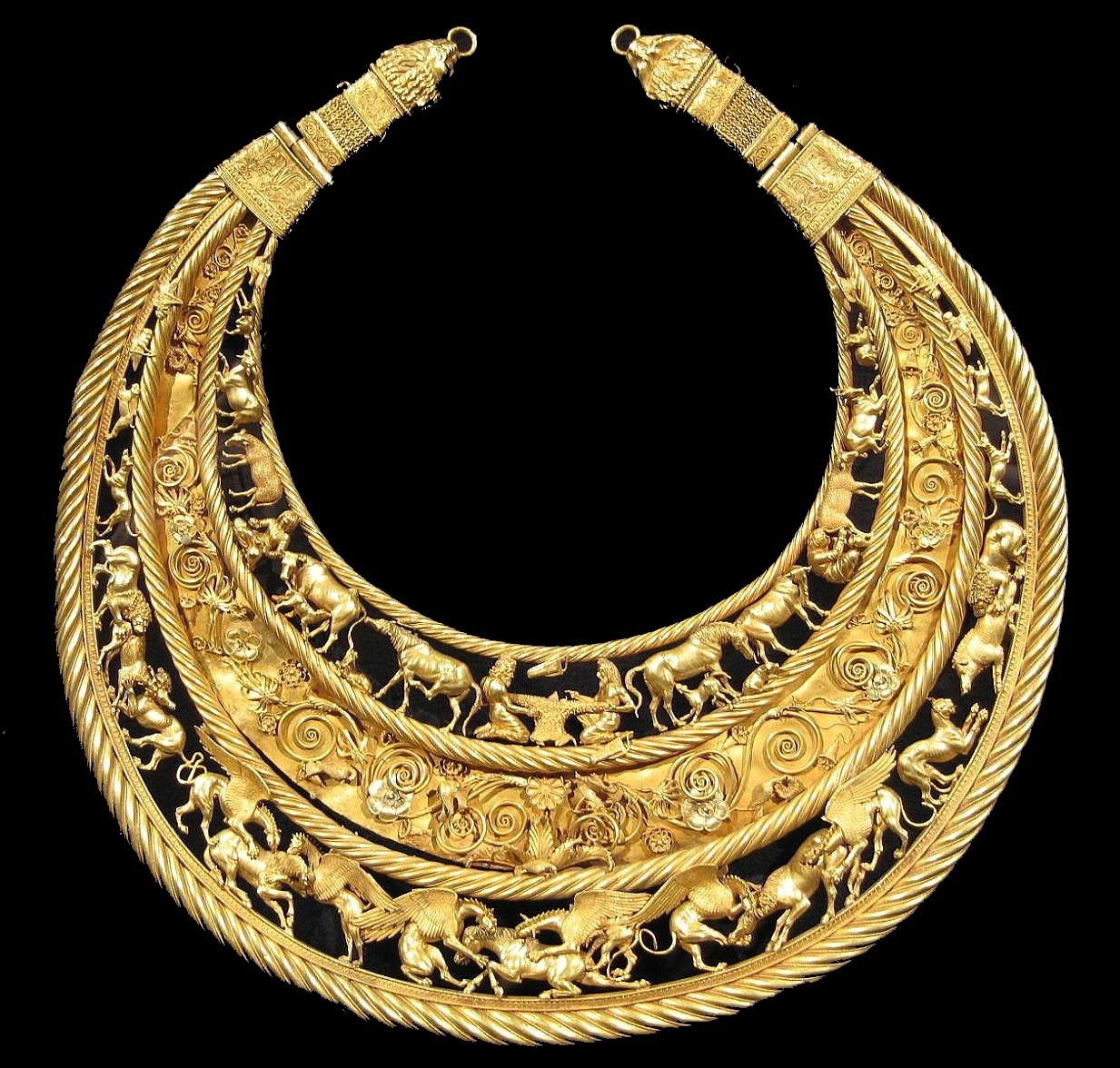
Golden Pectoral from Tovsta Mohyla

The Golden Pectoral from Tovsta Mohyla is a gold Scythian collar or pectoral discovered in a burial kurgan at a site called Tovsta Mohyla in modern Dnipropetrovsk Oblast, Ukraine, in 1971 by the Ukrainian archaeologist Borys Mozolevskyi. The Tovsta Mohyla burial mound, meaning fat barrow, is in present-day southern Ukraine near the city of Pokrov. It is now in the Museum of Historical Treasures of Ukraine in Kyiv.

It probably dates from the 4th century BC, and was probably made in Scythian lands.

== History ==
The ancient Scythians were a semi-nomadic Iranian people that lived around the northern area of the Black Sea with territory that stretched up into the Ural and Altai Mountain region. Their culture is thought to have lasted almost 1000 years, during which time they traded regularly with many Mediterranean and Asian cultures including the ancient Greeks, the ancient Persians and the ancient Chinese.

The golden pectoral or breastplate is thought to have been ordered by a Scythian chieftain, made either by the native Scythian artisans, as some modern scholarly opinion maintains, or as usually thought, by ancient Greek metalworkers probably located in Panticapaeum which is in present-day Crimea on the Black Sea. The pectoral is made of solid 24 carat gold, with a diameter of 12 inches (30.6 cm) and weighs just over 2.5 pounds (1150 g) It is in the shape of a crescent and can be stylistically broken down into three sections. The top section, which is widely agreed to be the main focus of the piece, reflects Scythian daily life. The middle section is believed to represent Scythian connection to nature. Being that there are so many delicate details in this section the artisan(s) chose to solder all of the individual elements to a solid gold plate which serves as a backing for structural support. The third section is thought to represent Scythian belief in the cosmos and their mythology.

It is believed that the pectoral was created by soldering together dozens of individually cast figures and elements.

Details of Golden Pectoral

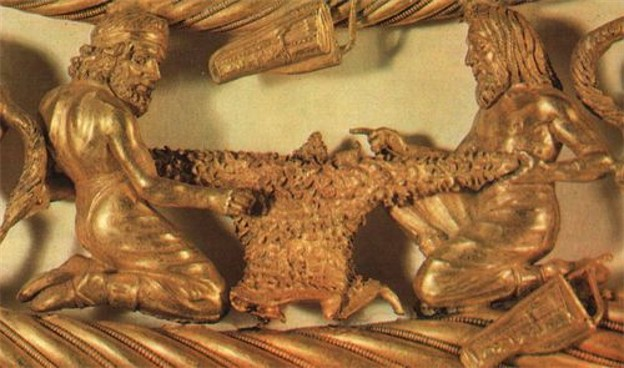
Scythian Pectoral (detail 1)

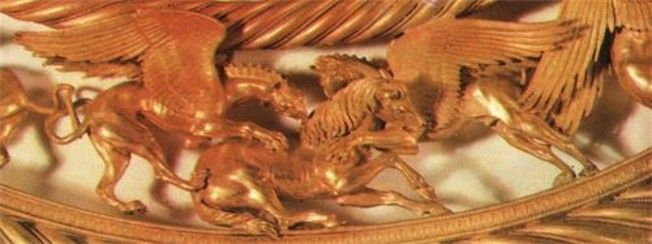
Scythian Pectoral (detail 2)

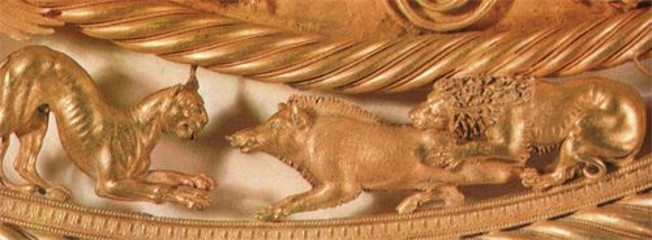
Scythian Pectoral (detail 3)

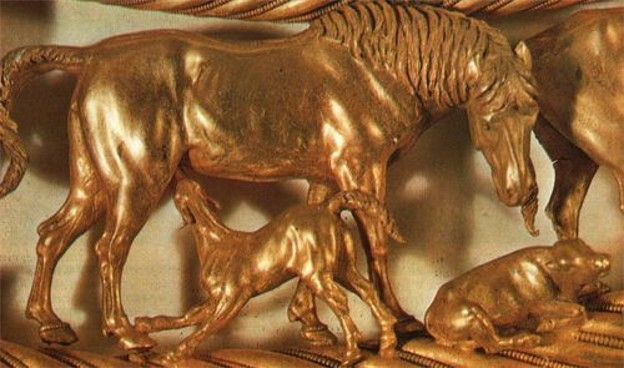
Scythian Pectoral (detail 4)

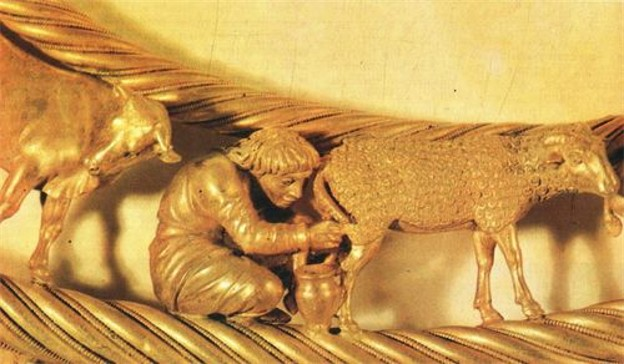
Scythian Pectoral (detail 5)

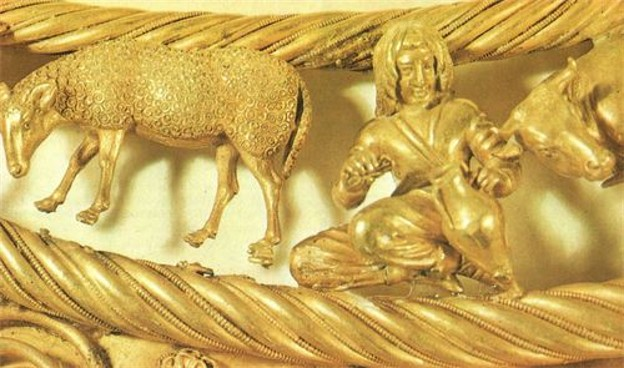
Scythian Pectoral (detail 6)

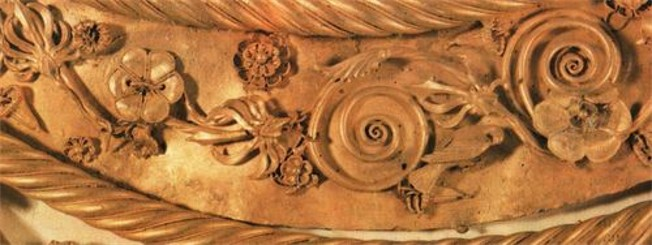
Scythian Pectoral (detail 7)

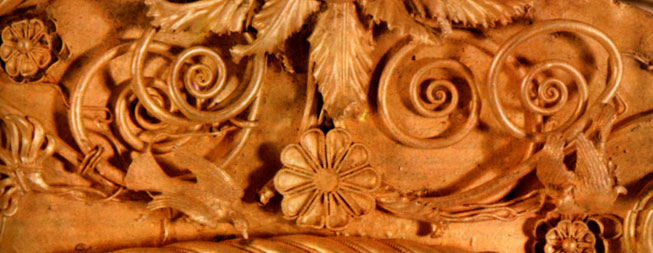
Scythian Pectoral (detail 8)
