= Jean Baptiste Métivier =

Jean Baptiste Métivier (1 April 1781 – 15 October 1857) was a French-German architect, senior Bavarian building official, and court architect to Maximilian de Beauharnais.

== Life ==
Jean Baptiste Métivier, born in Rennes on 1 April 1781, came from a family of architects. After completing his training in Paris and marrying Jeanne Marie Menagé, he moved to Munich in 1811. Through the patronage of the minister Maximilian von Montgelas, he received his first commissions and, in 1816, was appointed Königlicher Bauinspektor (Royal Building Inspector). Two years later, he became Hofdekorateur (Court Decorator) and was commissioned to design the interior of the auditorium in the National Theatre. In 1824 he was promoted to Königlicher Baurat (Royal Building Councillor).

In Munich, Métivier primarily built palaces for the aristocracy and upper society. Most of these, however, were destroyed during the Second World War, including the palace of Count Maximilian von Montgelas on the Karolinenplatz and the small château of the Minister of War Nikolaus von Maillot de la Treille in Schwabing.

The accession to the throne in 1825 of Ludwig I of Bavaria, who was hostile toward the French, had an adverse effect on Métivier’s career. Leo von Klenze was now favoured instead. Despite Métivier’s already completed masterpieces, he was marginalized and relegated to the second rank. On several of Klenze’s buildings, Métivier executed the designs for the interior decoration; Klenze, in turn, stood godfather to one of Métivier’s children.

Among Métivier’s other major works were the Synagogue on Westenriederstraße in Munich (built 1826, demolished in 1887) and the Marstall with riding hall at St. Emmeram’s Abbey in Regensburg (built 1827–1831).

Métivier also designed furniture and interior furnishings, as well as festive decorations and illuminations.

From 1836 onward, in addition to his other responsibilities, Jean Baptiste Métivier held the post of court architect to Maximilian de Beauharnais, 3rd Duke of Leuchtenberg.

== Grave ==
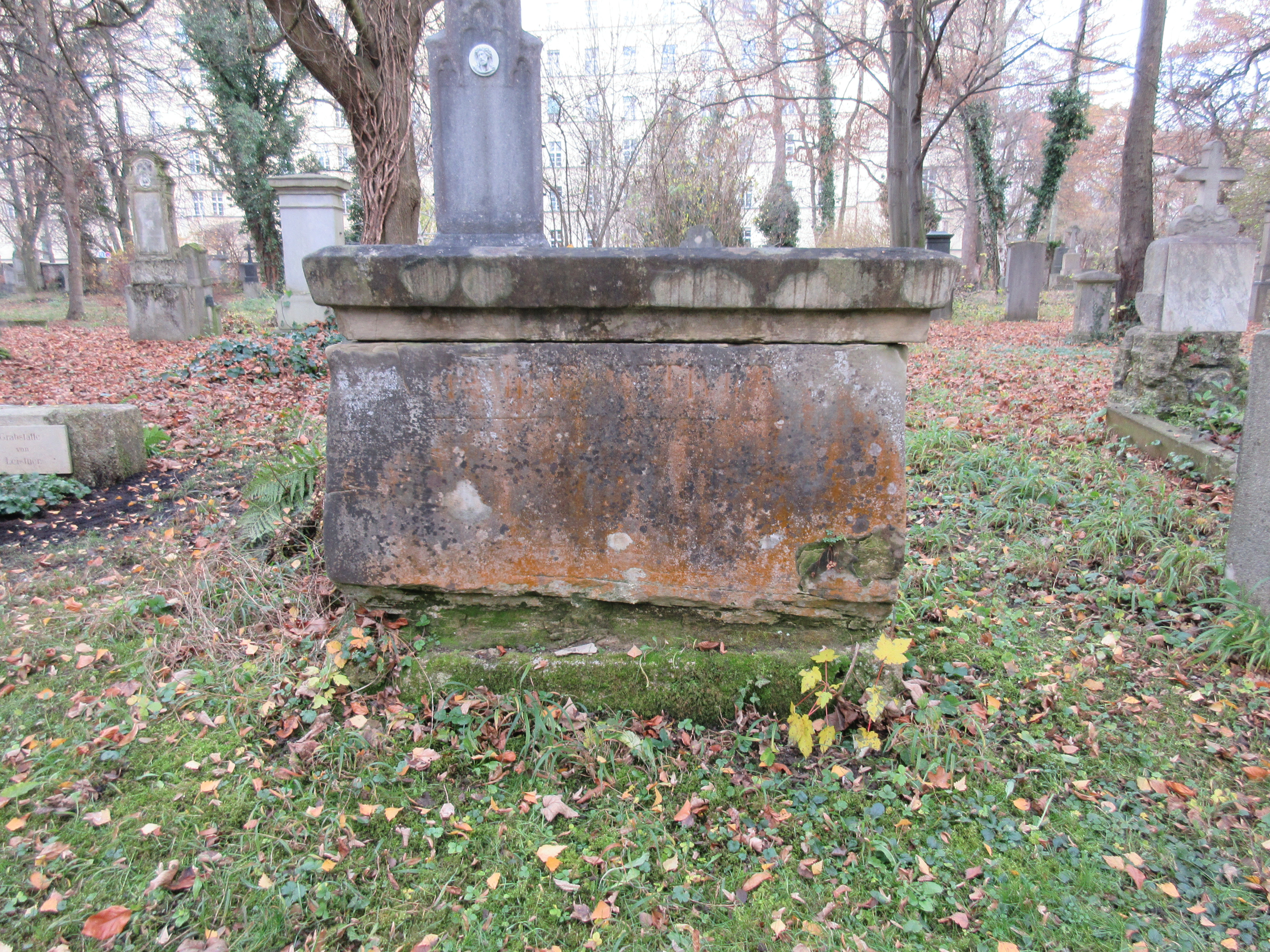
Grave of Jean Métivier in the Alter Südfriedhof (Old Southern Cemetery) in Munich

Métivier’s grave is located in the Alter Südfriedhof (Old Southern Cemetery) in Munich (Grave field 9 – Row 1 – Plot 19).

== Appreciation ==
According to curated information from the Brown House, Munich museum, "Métivier was regarded as one of the most gifted architects in Bavaria, but he unfortunately had the misfortune of working in the shadow of two star architects at the time, Leo von Klenze and Friedrich von Gärtner."

No commemoration in the form of a street name or similar honour has yet been bestowed on Jean Baptiste Métivier by the city of Munich.

== Selected works ==
In addition to the buildings already mentioned, notable works include:

- the Prinz-Carl-Palais in Munich (1804–06 and 1827)
- the Palais Woronzow (Munich) (1807–08 and 1820)
- the interior of the New Palace in Pappenheim (1822)
- interior design of the National Theatre, Munich
- the Palais Almeida in Munich (1824)
- Schloss Weyhern (1826)
- the Palais Barlow in Munich (1828)
- interior of the Prinz-Carl-Palais (1830)
- interior of the old St. Matthew’s Church in Munich (1833)
- the former Kurhaus in Bad Homburg (1843)
- expansion of Schloss Nannhofen near Mammendorf, Fürstenfeldbruck District (1848)

== Bibliography ==
- Bauer, Karl (2014). Regensburg. Kunst-, Kultur- und Alltagsgeschichte (6th ed.). Regenstauf: MZ-Buchverlag im H. Gietl Verlag & Publikationsservice GmbH. pp. 339–340. ISBN 978-3-86646-300-4.
- Heusler, Andreas (1999). Stadtarchiv München (ed.). Beth ha-Knesseth. Ort der Zusammenkunft. Zur Geschichte der Münchner Synagogen, ihrer Rabbiner und Kantoren. München: Buchendorfer Verlag. p. 39. ISBN 3-934036-09-0.
- Holland, Hyacinth (1885). "Metivier, Johann Baptist". Allgemeine Deutsche Biographie. Vol. 21. Leipzig: Duncker & Humblot. pp. 518–519.
- Rau, Hermann (1997). Jean Baptiste Métivier. Architekt, Königlich Bayerischer Hofbaumeister, Hofdekorateur und Baurat (1781–1857). Kallmünz: Lassleben. ISBN 3-7847-1521-4.
- Ruck, G. (2009). "Métivier, Jean-Baptiste". Allgemeines Künstlerlexikon. Vol. 89. Leipzig: De Gruyter. pp. 226–227.
- Zimmermann, Florian (1984). Wohnbau in München 1800–1850. Miscellanea Bavarica Monacensia. Vol. 129. München: Stadtarchiv München.
