= Zentralinstitut für Kunstgeschichte =

German art history research institute

Central Institute for Art History
- Zentralinstitut für Kunstgeschichte
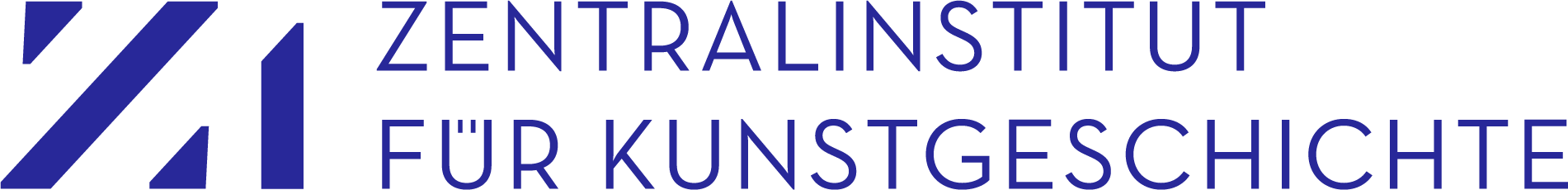

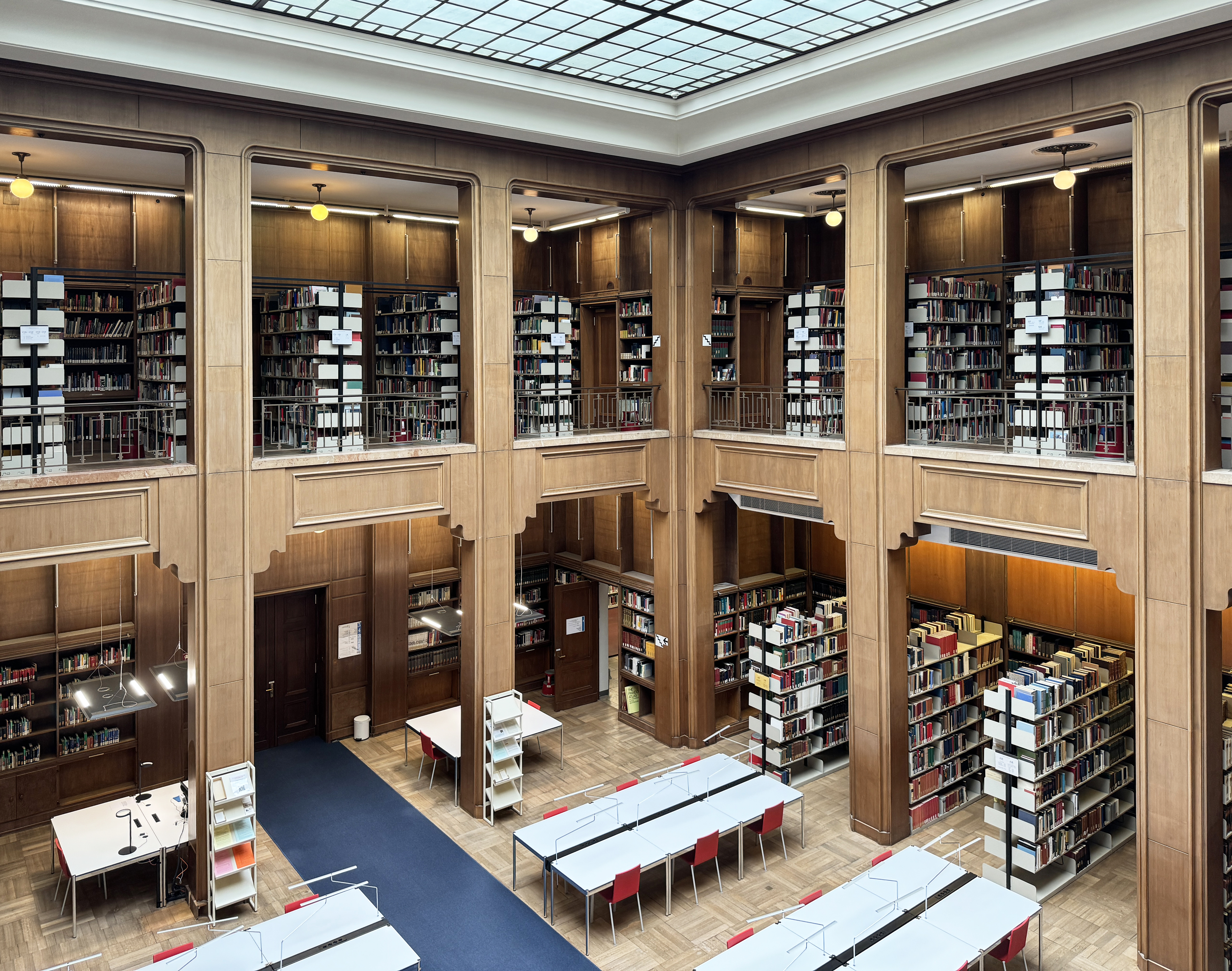
- The institute's main reading room
- Formation: November 1946
- Location: Munich, Bavaria, Germany
- Coordinates: 48°8′40.1″N 11°33′59.7″E
- Director: Ulrich Pfisterer
- Website: http://www.zikg.eu/

The Zentralinstitut für Kunstgeschichte (ZI; 'Central Institute for Art History'), is an independent art-historical research institute in Munich, Germany. The institute is located in the former administration building of the National Socialist party near Königsplatz.

The institute is supported by the Bavarian State Ministry of Sciences, Research and Art, and is supervised by an international board of trustees. It defines itself as both a place of academic exchange and a platform for international encounters. It organizes lectures and symposia and edits various art history publications, for instance, the Reallexikon zur Deutschen Kunstgeschichte and the Kunstchronik, an art journal featuring articles on museological matters, important exhibitions and art-historical conferences, and the preservation of monuments and historic buildings. The institute also maintains one of the world's most comprehensive art libraries, with more than 650,000 volumes, 1,200 current periodicals and over 75,000 auction sales catalogues, and an extensive collection of photographs of artworks.

After its foundation in 1946, the Zentralinstitut für Kunstgeschichte started its activities in 1947 under its first director Ludwig Heinrich Heydenreich. After his retirement in 1970, Willibald Sauerländer succeeded him as the second director of the ZI. The latter was followed in 1991 by Wolf Tegethoff. In 2015, Ulrich Pfisterer was also appointed director of the institute. Tegethoff and Pfisterer were joint leaders of the ZI until the end of 2017. In 2018 Ulrich Pfisterer became director of the ZI.

The institute is located in a historic building on Königsplatz, the former Administrative Building of the National Socialist Party. The Munich Central Collecting Point had been installed in this building in June 1945 by the American military government. The mission of this art collecting facility was the restitution to the rightful owners of looted art confiscated by the National Socialist regime all over Europe during World War II.

== See also ==
- Münchner Haus der Kulturinstitute
- Brown House, Munich
- Munich Central Collecting Point
- Alfred Pringsheim
