= Münchner Haus der Kulturinstitute =

Coordinates: 48°08′40″N 11°33′59″E

Münchner Haus der Kulturinstitute is located in Maxvorstadt, Munich, Bavaria, Germany.

== See also ==
- Brown House, Munich
- Munich Central Collecting Point
- Zentralinstitut für Kunstgeschichte
- Alfred Pringsheim
