= Brown House, Munich =

Former Nazi Party headquarters building in Germany

Coordinates: 48°08′43″N 11°34′03″E

Brown House
- Braunes Haus
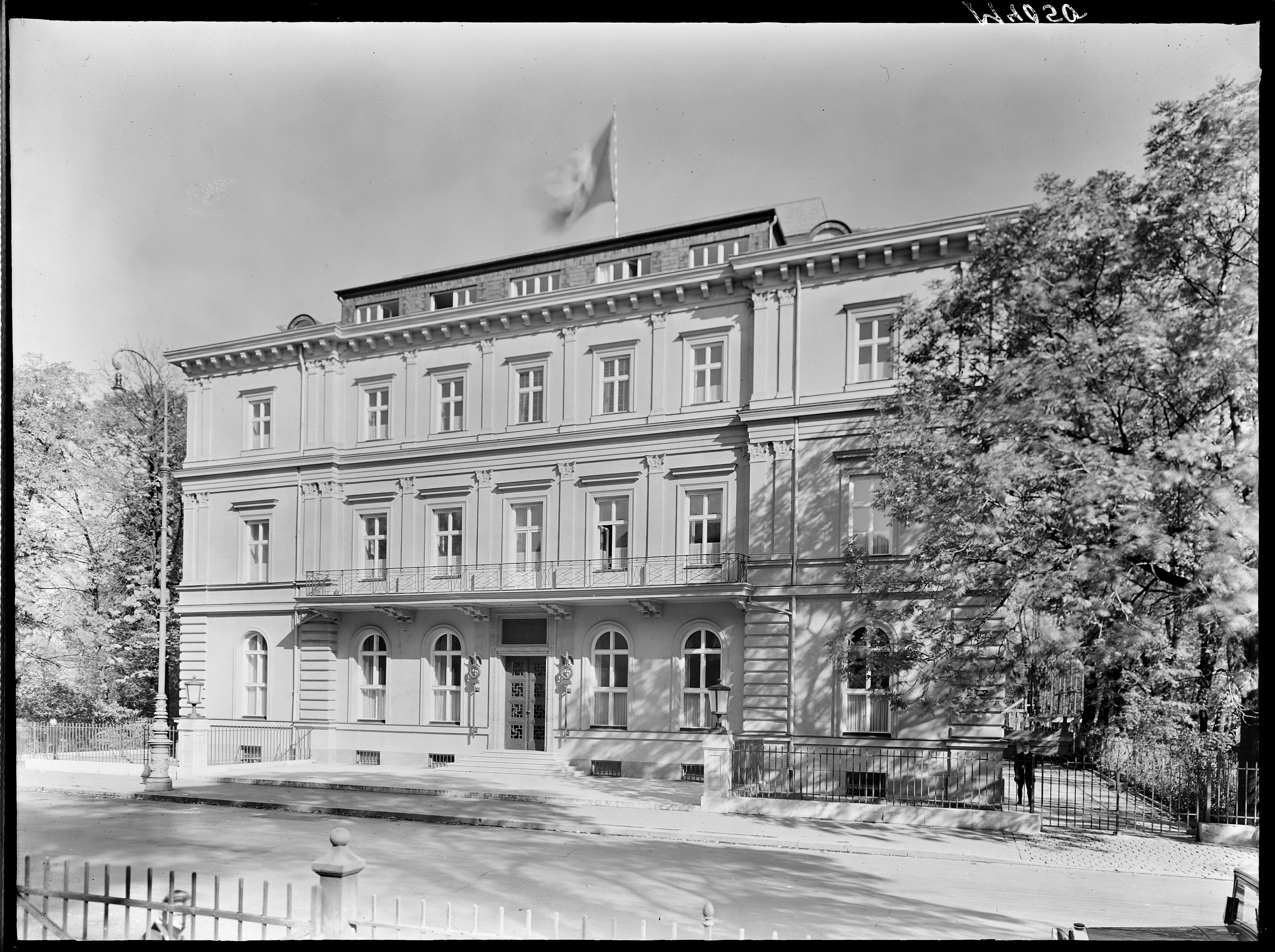
- The Brown House c. 1932. Photo: NARA
- Interactive map of the Brown House area
- Former names: Palais Barlow (1876–1930)

General information
- Architectural style: Neo-classicism
- Location: 45 Brienner Straße, Munich
- Completed: 1828
- Renovated: 1930
- Destroyed: 1943
- Owner: Nazi Party

Design and construction
- Architect: Jean Baptiste Métivier

Renovating team
- Architect: Paul Troost

The Brown House (German: Braunes Haus) was the name given to the Munich mansion located between the Karolinenplatz and Königsplatz, known before as the Palais Barlow, which was purchased in 1930 for the Nazis. They converted the structure into the headquarters of the National Socialist German Workers' Party (Nationalsozialistische Deutsche Arbeiterpartei; NSDAP). Its name comes from early Nazi Party uniforms, which were brown. Many leading Nazis, including Adolf Hitler, maintained offices there throughout the party's existence. It was destroyed by Allied bombing raids during World War II.

== History ==
In 1920, the Nazis opened their first party headquarters at the Sterneckerbräu in Munich. Between 1922 and the failed Beer Hall Putsch in November 1923, Adolf Hitler and the Nazis used a smaller structure at Corneliusstraße 12 for their meetings. For a time following the party's reorganization on 27 February 1925, they met at the Eher Verlag on Thierstraße 15, which eventually became the central NSDAP publishing house. Their last base of operations was at Schellingstraße 50 before they moved into the Brown House.

A large impressive stone structure, the building that would later be the Nazi Party center of operations was located at 45 Brienner Straße in Munich, Bavaria. Situated between Karolinenplatz and Königsplatz, the mansion was built in 1828 by Jean Baptiste Métivier in neoclassical style for the aristocrat Karl Freiherr von Lotzbeck. From 1876—until the Nazis took it over—the building was known as Palais Barlow. By 1930, the NSDAP headquarters at Schellingstrasse 50 had become too small (with the number of workers increasing from four in 1925 to 50 that year). In April 1930, Elizabeth Stefanie Barlow (widow of William Barlow (1869–1928), an English wholesale merchant) offered the Palais Barlow for purchase to Franz Xaver Schwarz, the NSDAP treasurer. A sales contract was signed on 26 May, with a purchase price of 805,864 marks. Funds for renovation were provided by industrialist Fritz Thyssen. The house was converted from an urban villa to an office building by the architect Paul Troost. He and Hitler also re-decorated it in a heavy, anti-modern style style. Early Hitler biographer, Konrad Heiden, claims that it was during the renovation of the Brown House, that Hitler "for the first time in his life" was able to "abandon himself to his passion for building and designing." It officially opened on 1 January 1931, which is when the party leadership moved into the building.

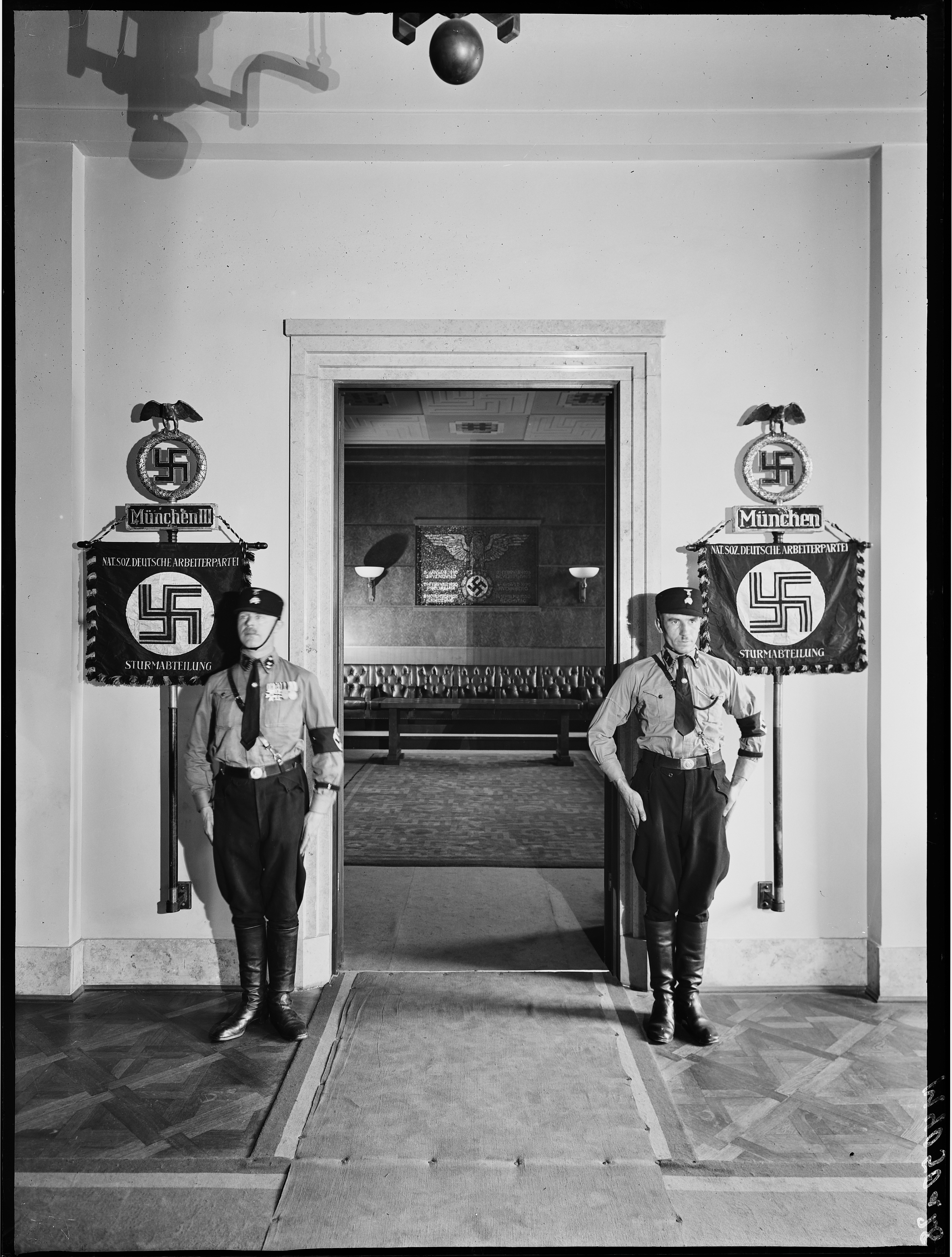
SA members on guard by NSDAP and SA Deutschland Erwache standards and the Senatorensaal conference room inside the Brown House, 1933 Photo: NARA

Acquiring the Brown House in Munich pleased Hitler, as operating from such a stately building helped provide the Nazi Party with an "image of respectability." Moreover, the existence of the Nazi Party in such a resplendent facility while the Weimar government still controlled Germany, furnished the appearance of an office comprising a "state within a state." Subsequent building projects emerged in the vicinity of the new party headquarters as the Brown House formed a sort of nucleus for Nazi construction and activity. Hitler maintained an office in the Brown House, as did Hans Frank, Heinrich Himmler, Hermann Göring, Rudolf Hess, Philipp Bouhler, and Franz Xaver Schwarz. A lavish office was constructed for Propaganda Minister Joseph Goebbels. Himmler was appointed head of security for the Brown House. Significant amounts of money were contributed to the party as a result of Göring's business contacts, some of which he used to construct an underground garage lift at his apartment in the Brown House leading straight to his personal lobby, so guests could discreetly visit him there. There was also a restaurant in the basement of the facility.

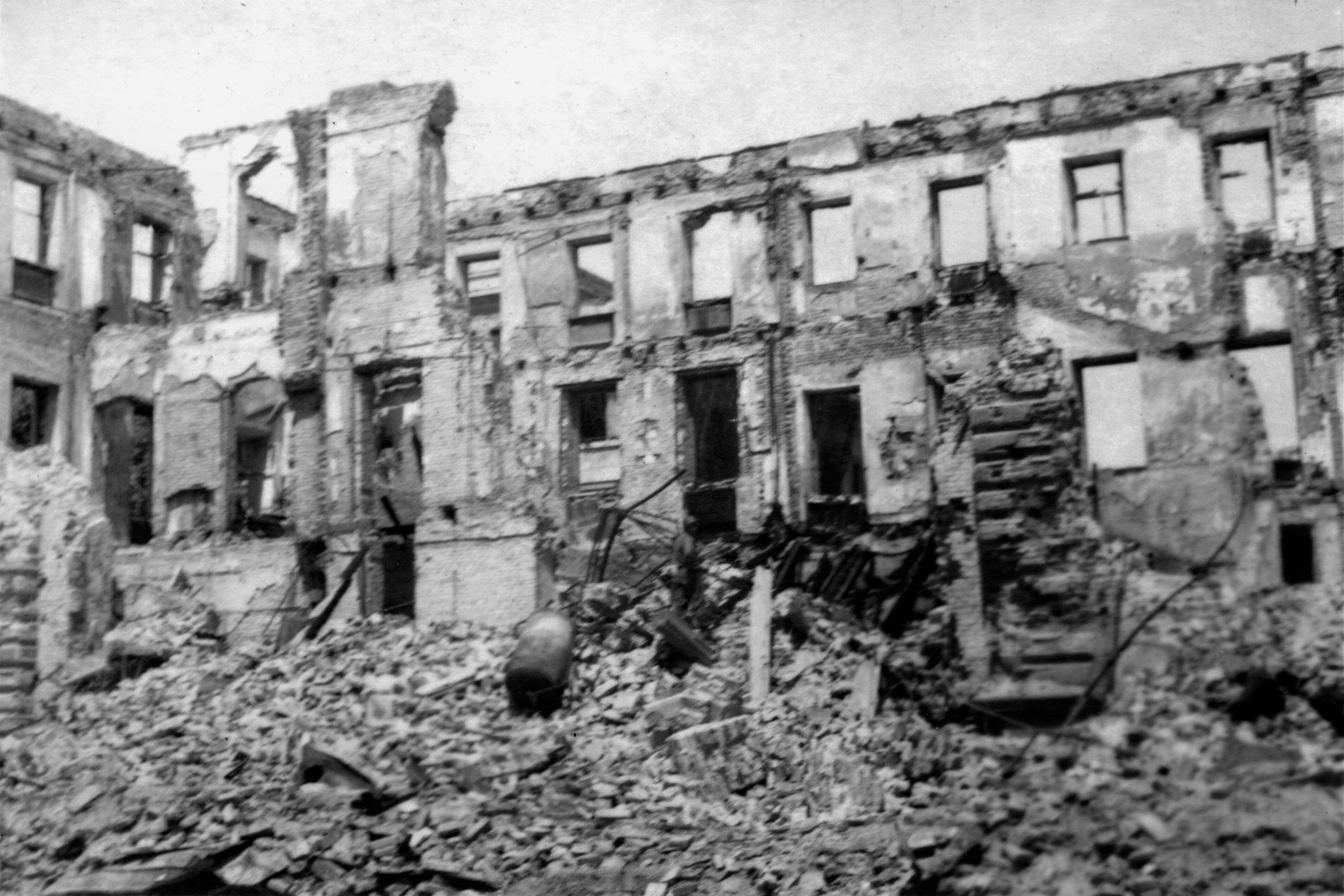
The Brown House in ruins, 1945

Hitler kept a life-size portrait of Henry Ford next to his desk at the Brown House office, as Ford and Hitler admired each other's achievements. Overlooking the Königplatz, Hitler's office also contained a bust of Benito Mussolini and a painting of Frederick the Great. (Note: Smoking was expressly forbidden in Hitler's office.) Also stored in the Brown House was the so-called Blutfahne ("blood flag" or "blood banner"). This was the NSDAP flag that had been carried at the head of the demonstration during the Beer Hall Putsch of November 1923, during which Munich police opened fire on the marchers; the flag was spattered with the blood of the wounded and became a sacred relic of the Nazi Party.

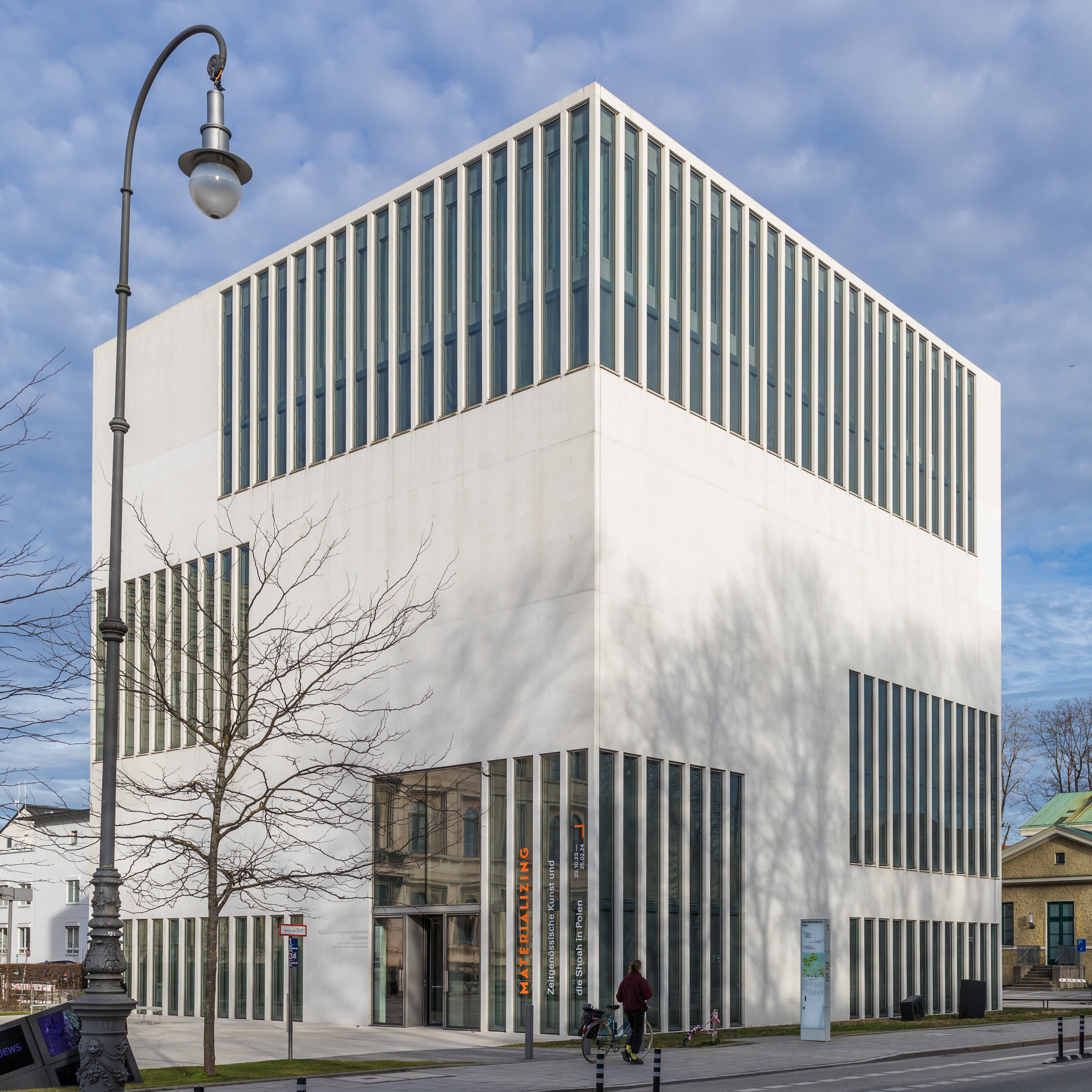
The National Socialism-Documentation Centre, 2015

During its period of operation as an HQ for the Nazi Party, the building was heavily guarded and shrouded in secrecy. Since the authorities sometimes carted arrested people into the Brown House for interrogation, the structure also acquired the nickname, the "Denuntiatur", which was a pun combining the "act of denunciation" and the papal nunciature that was across the street.

The Brown House was damaged by an Allied bombing raid, led by the British, on 9 March 1943. It was then largely destroyed in another Allied bombing raid which took place in October 1943, and the rubble was cleared away. In December 2005, the government of Bavaria announced that the site would become the home of the Munich Documentation Centre for the History of National Socialism (NS-Dokumentationszentrum). The building has since been completed and is open to the public.

== See also ==
- Münchner Haus der Kulturinstitute
- Munich Central Collecting Point
- Zentralinstitut für Kunstgeschichte
