= Munich Central Collecting Point =

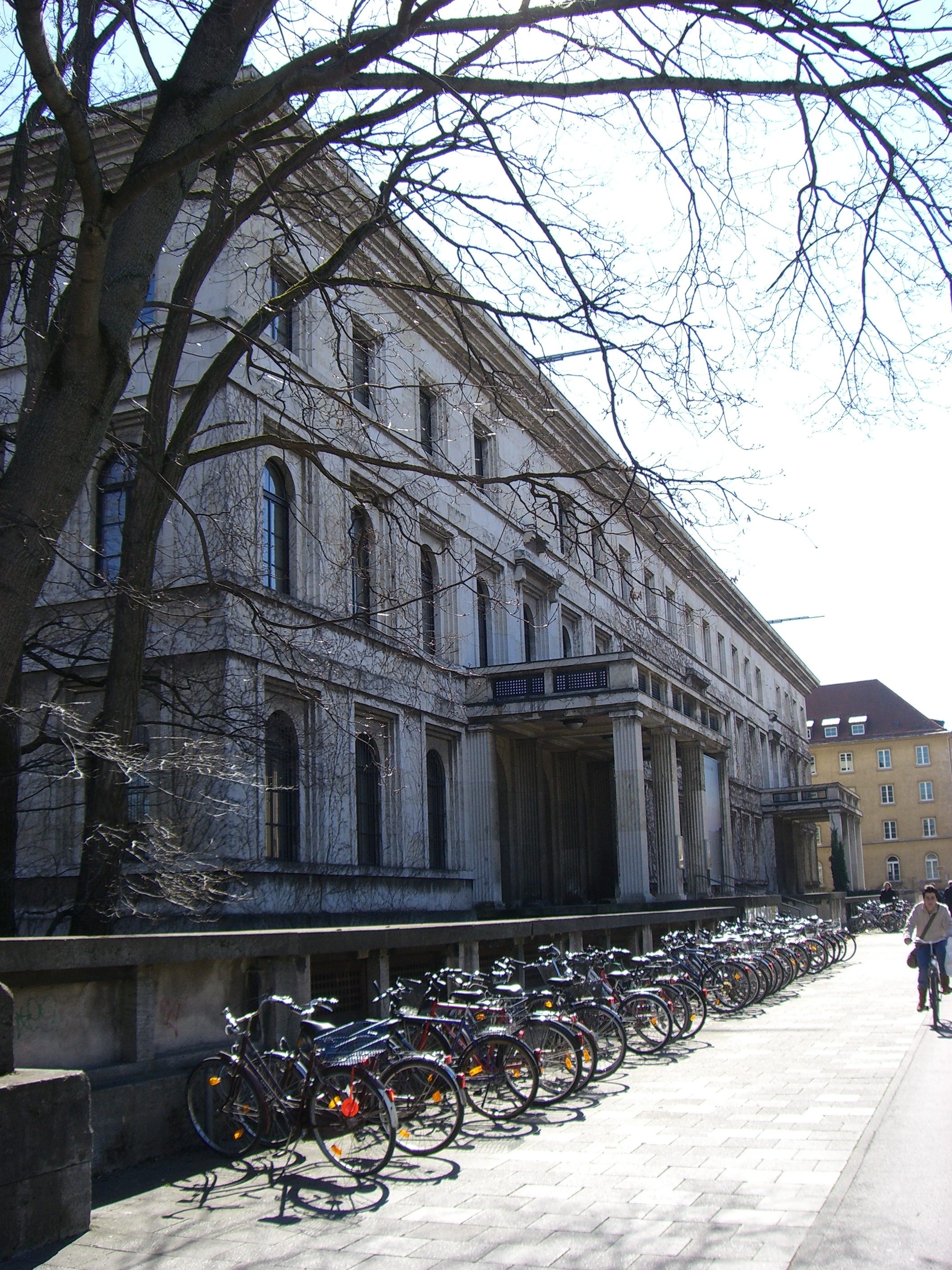
Gallery I of the Central Collecting Point, formerly a Nazi administration building and today the Hochschule für Musik und Theater München

The Munich Central Collecting Point was a depot used by the Monuments, Fine Arts, and Archives program after the end of the Second World War to process, photograph and redistribute artwork and cultural artifacts that had been confiscated by the Nazis and hidden throughout Germany and Austria. Other Central Collecting Points were located at Marburg, Wiesbaden and Offenbach, with the overall aim of giving restitution for the artifacts to their countries of origin.

Lieutenant Craig Hugh Smyth was responsible for establishing the Munich Central Collecting Point in July 1945, converting former Nazi Party offices into a depot complete with photography studios and conservation labs. The depot's activities were directed by Herbert S. Leonard.

The Munich Central Collecting Point mainly processed artwork from European museums and private collections, including Hitler's collection found at Altaussee. This included paintings, sculptures, metalwork and other objects. These restitution activities at Munich ceased in 1951.

In 2016 investigative journalists at Suddeutsche Zeitung reported that Commission for Looted Art in Europe (CLAE), had discovered that "The Monuments Men tracked down Nazi looted art. Only for German museum directors to return it to the families of the Nazi leaders rather than to the Jewish families who were its rightful owners."

Archives of materials relating to the Munich Central Collecting Point are located in two repositories in the USA. Original inventory records and photographs of works of art are held by the National Archives and Records Administration. There is a further archive of photographs, and microfilm copies of the inventory cards, in the Photographic Archives at the National Gallery of Art in Washington, DC.

== See also ==
- Münchner Haus der Kulturinstitute
- Brown House, Munich
- Zentralinstitut für Kunstgeschichte

== Bibliography ==
- Lauterbach, Iris (2018). The Central Collecting Point in Munich: A New Beginning for the Restitution and Protection of Art. Los Angeles: Getty Research Institute. ISBN 1606065823.
- Schuhmacher, Jacques (2024). Nazi-Era Provenance of Museum Collections: A research guide. London: UCL Press, pp. 47–57. ISBN 9781800086906.
