= Ulrich Pfisterer (art historian) =

German art historian

Ulrich Pfisterer (born December 30, 1968, in Kirchheim unter Teck) is a German art historian whose scholarship focuses on the art of Renaissance Italy. He is currently a professor of art history at LMU Munich and the director of the Zentralinstitut für Kunstgeschichte.

== Life ==
Ulrich Pfisterer studied art history, classical archaeology, and philosophy at the University of Freiburg and LMU Munich. In 1997, he received his Ph.D. from the University of Göttingen with a dissertation on “Donatello and the Discovery of Style, 1430-1445” (Donatello und die Entdeckung der Stile, 1430–1445). He was subsequently a postdoctoral fellow at the Kunsthistorisches Institut in Florence with a lectureship at the University of Göttingen. From 1999 to 2002, he was an assistant professor and from 2002 to 2006 a junior professor at the Kunstgeschichtliches Seminar at the University of Hamburg. In 2006, he completed his Habilitation in Hamburg with a book on “Lysippus and his Friends: Gifts and Memory in Renaissance Rome – or, the First Century of Medallions” (Lysippus und seine Freunde. Liebesgaben und Gedächtnis im Rom der Renaissance – oder: Das erste Jahrhundert der Medaille). Ulrich Pfisterer has had fellowships at the Bibliotheca Hertziana – Max Planck Institute for Art History in Rome, the Kunsthistorisches Institut in Florence, the Herzog August Library in Wolfenbüttel, the Getty Research Institute in Los Angeles and the Center for Advanced Study in the Visual Arts CASVA/The National Gallery of Art in Washington, D.C. He was invited Director of Studies at the École pratique des hautes études/Sorbonne University in Paris and a Fellow at the research group “BildEvidenz. History and Aesthetics” at the Free University of Berlin. Since October 2006, he has been Professor of Art History at the Institut für Kunstgeschichte at LMU Munich (chaired since 2008). In June 2015, he was named Director of the Zentralinstitut für Kunstgeschichte (2015–2017 together with Wolf Tegethoff). Since 2018 he has been the sole director of the Zentralinstitut für Kunstgeschichte.

== Memberships ==
- 2012–2017 Member of the Senate committee for the Research Training Groups of the Deutsche Forschungsgemeinschaft
- Since 2015 Member of the Academia Europaea
- Since 2017 Member of the Bavarian Academy of Sciences and Humanities

== Works ==
Monographs

- Sistine Chapel – Paradise in Rome, translated by David Dollenmayer. Getty Publications, Los Angeles 2018 (Translation of Ulrich Pfisterer, Die Sixtinische Kapelle. Beck, München 2013).
- L‘artista procreatore. L‘amore e le arti nella prima età moderna. Campisano, Rom 2018 (Translation of Ulrich Pfisterer: Kunst-Geburten. Kreativität, Erotik, Körper. Wagenbach, Berlin 2014)
- Kunst-Geburten. Kreativität, Erotik, Körper. Wagenbach, Berlin 2014.
- La Cappella Sistina. Campisano editore, Rome 2014 (expanded Italian edition with an appendix on the literary fame of the Sistine Chapel).
- Die Sixtinische Kapelle. Beck, Munich 2013.
- Pierre II Woeiriot de Bouzey, Antiquarum statuarum Vrbis Romae liber primus (um 1575). Manutius, Heidelberg 2012.
- Lysippus und seine Freunde. Liebesgaben und Gedächtnis im Rom der Renaissance oder: Das erste Jahrhundert der Medaille. Akademie, Berlin 2008 (Habilitationsschrift).
- Donatello und die Entdeckung der Stile, 1430–1445 (Studien der Bibliotheca Hertziana, 17). Hirmer, Munich 2002 (Dissertation).
- Die Kunstliteratur der italienischen Renaissance: Eine Geschichte in Quellen. Reclam, Stuttgart 2002.
- with Anna S. Rühl: Renaissance. Das 16. Jahrhundert (Galerie der großen Meister). DuMont, Cologne 2000.

Edited volumes

- with Christine Tauber: Einfluss, Strömung, Quelle. Aquatische Metaphern der Kunstgeschichte. transcript, Bielefeld 2018.
- with Annalena Döring and Franz Hefele: Platz da im Pantheon! Künstler in gedruckten Porträtserien bis 1800. Dietmar Klinger Verlag, Passau 2018.
- with Martin Hirsch: "Die andere Seiten. Funktionen und Wissensformen der frühen Medaille." Numismatische Zeitschrift 122/123, 2017.
- Figurationen des Übergangs. Die Große Kette der Wesen in der Renaissance, Wolfenbütteler Renaissance-Mitteilungen 37, 2016.
- Fritz Burger (1877–1916) – ‚eine neue Kunstgeschichte‘. Dietmar Klinger Verlag, Passau 2016.
- with Matteo Burioni and Burcu Dogramaci: Kunstgeschichten 1915. 100 Jahre Heinrich Wölfflin: Kunstgeschichtliche Grundbegriffe. Dietmar Klinger Verlag, Passau 2015.
- with Hans-Christian Hoenes: Aby Warburg – Fragmente zur Ausdruckskunde (Gesammelte Schriften – Studienausgabe, Vol. IV). De Gruyter, Berlin 2015.
- with Maria Heilmann, Nino Nanobashvili, Tobias Teutenberg: Lernt Zeichnen! Techniken zwischen Kunst und Wissenschaft | 1525–1925, Exh. Cat. Zentralinstitut für Kunstgeschichte Munich, Universitätsbibliothek Heidelberg. Dietmar Klinger Verlag, Passau 2015.
- with Maria Heilmann, Nino Nanobashvili, Tobias Teutenberg: Punkt, Punkt, Komma, Strich. Zeichenbücher in Europa ca. 1525–1925, Exh.-cat. Zentralinstitut für Kunstgeschichte Munich, Universitätsbibliothek Heidelberg. Dietmar Klinger Verlag, Passau 2014.
- with Walter Cupperi, Martin Hirsch and Anette Kranz: Wettstreit in Erz. Porträtmedaillen der deutschen Renaissance, Exh. Cat. Staatliche Münzsammlung Munich, coin collections of the Kunsthistorisches Museum in Vienna and the Staatliche Kunstsammlungen Dresden. Deutscher Kunstverlag, Berlin 2013.
- with Matthias Krüger and Christine Ott: Die Biologie der Kreativität. Ein meta-ästhetisches Denkmodell in der Moderne. Diaphanes, Zürich/Berlin 2013.
- Giorgio Vasari: Das Leben des Donatello und Michelozzo. Wagenbach, Berlin 2013.
- with Maria Effinger and Cornelia Logemann: Götterbilder und Götzendiener in der Frühen Neuzeit. Europas Blick auf fremde Religionen, Exh.-cat. Heidelberg. Winter, Heidelberg 2012.
- with Gabriele Wimböck: Novità: Neuheitskonzepte in den Bildkünsten um 1600. Diaphanes, Zürich/Berlin 2011.
- with Jan Dirk Müller, Fabian Jonietz & Anna Kathrin Bleuler: Aemulatio. Kulturen des Wettstreits in Text und Bild (1450–1620) (Pluralisierung und Autorität, Vol. 27). De Gruyter, Berlin/New York 2011.
- Metzler Lexikon Kunstwissenschaft. Ideen, Methoden, Begriffe (2nd expanded edition). J.B. Metzler, Stuttgart 2011.
- Paul Fürst: Theoria Artis Pictoriae, das ist: Reiß-Buch, bestehend in kunstrichtiger, leichter und der naturgemässer Anweisung zu der Mahlerey ... (Nürnberg 1656). Universitätsbibliothek der Universität Heidelberg, Heidelberg 2009 (Fontes; 36).
- Giulio Strozzi, La Venetia edificata ... poema eroico (Venedig 1624): das 11. Kapitel zur Personifikation der 'Kunst' und zur "Galleria del Cielo". Universitätsbibliothek der Universität Heidelberg, Heidelberg 2008 (Fontes; 10).
- Klassiker der Kunstgeschichte. Band 2: Von Panofsky bis Greenberg. Beck, München 2008.
- Klassiker der Kunstgeschichte. Band 1: Von Winckelmann bis Warburg. Beck, München 2007.
- Giovanni Luigi Valesio, Parere dell'instabile academico incaminato intorno ad una postilla del Conte Andrea dell'Arca contra una particella, che tratta della pittura ... in difesa d'un sonetto del Cavalier Marino (Bologna 1614). Universitätsbibliothek der Universität Heidelberg, Heidelberg 2007 (Fontes; 3).
- Animationen/Transgressionen: Das Kunstwerk als Lebewesen (Hamburger Forschungen zur Kunstgeschichte; 4). Akademie, Berlin 2005.
- with Valeska von Rosen: Der Künstler als Kunstwerk. Selbstporträts vom Mittelalter bis zur Gegenwart. Reclam, Stuttgart 2005.
- Metzler Lexikon Kunstwissenschaft. Ideen, Methoden, Begriffe. J.B. Metzler, Stuttgart 2003.
- with Max Seidel: Visuelle Topoi. Erfindung und tradiertes Wissen in den Künsten der italienischen Renaissance (Italienische Forschungen des Kunsthistorischen Institutes in Florenz, 4. F., Vol. 3). Deutscher Kunstverlag, München/Berlin 2003.
