= Museum of Historical Treasures of Ukraine =

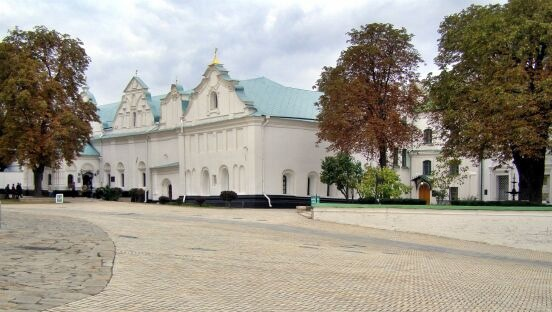
- Museum of Historical Treasures of Ukraine
- Established: 28 December 1963; 62 years ago
- Location: Kyiv, Kyiv Oblast, Ukraine, 01015
- Coordinates: 50°26′08″N 30°30′27″E
- Type: Art museum and historic site
- Collection size: 56000 in 2022
- Director: Nataliya Oleksandrivna Panchenko
- Website: goldenukr.com.ua

The Treasury of the National Museum of the History of Ukraine (Ukrainian: Скарбниця Національного музею історії України, formerly the Museum of Historical Treasures of Ukraine) is a museum that serves as a branch of the National Museum of the History of Ukraine. The exposition focuses on historical and artistic artefacts made of precious metals and gemstones. It is located on the territory of the National Reserve "Kyiv-Pechersk Lavra".

== History ==
The branch was established by government order in 1963 under the name "Golden Chamber" as a division of the State Historical Museum of the Ukrainian SSR. The initial collection was created in accordance with the order to transfer works of precious metals and gemstones from twenty museum institutions. The newly established museum facility was adapted in building No. 12 (Kovnirivsky Building) on the territory of the Kyiv Pechersk Lavra, the former monastery bakery, and bookstore.

The branch was opened to visitors on 4 January 1969.

In addition to transferred [exhibits], a significant contribution to the creation of the Museum of Historical Treasures was made by collections of finds (in total, over 30,000 items) received from the Institute of Archaeology of the Academy of Sciences of the Ukrainian SSR.

In 2004, repairs were carried out, and the exhibition was updated. The building was thoroughly renovated, and the branch received modern exhibition and storage equipment.

On 16 November 2015, the collective of the branch publicly expressed disagreement with the orders and the new structure of the National Museum of the History of Ukraine, as well as the liquidation of the status of the MIKU collection, considering the decisions of the then director of the National Museum of the History of Ukraine, to be erroneous and could lead to irreversible consequences.

In 2021, the branch was renamed from "Museum of Historical Treasures of Ukraine" to "Treasury of the National Museum of the History of Ukraine".
