= Timeline of Munich =

The following is a timeline of the history of the city of Munich, Germany.

== Prior to 17th century ==
- 1158 - Duke Henry the Lion builds bridge, mint, and salt-depot.
- 1175 - Munich gains official status as city.
- 1239 - Coat of arms of Munich in use.
- 1240 - Otto II Wittelsbach in power.
- 1255 - City becomes ducal residence of Upper Bavaria.
- 1327
  - Fire.
  - City then rebuilt by Louis the Bavarian
- 1332 - Salt monopoly granted by Louis IV.
- 1368
  - Cathedral construction begins.
  - St. Peter's Church reconstructed.
- 1383 - Löwenbräu founded.
- 1385 - Munich Residenz built.
- 1394 - Town Hall built.
- 1397 - Guild uprising.
- 1429 - Fire.
- 1482 - Johann Schauer sets up printing press.
- 1494 - Frauenkirche consecrated.
- 1506 - City becomes capital of Bavaria.
- 1576 - Jesuit school built (approximate date).

== 17th-18th centuries ==
- 1609 - Catholic League founded.
- 1617 - Hofgarten laid out.
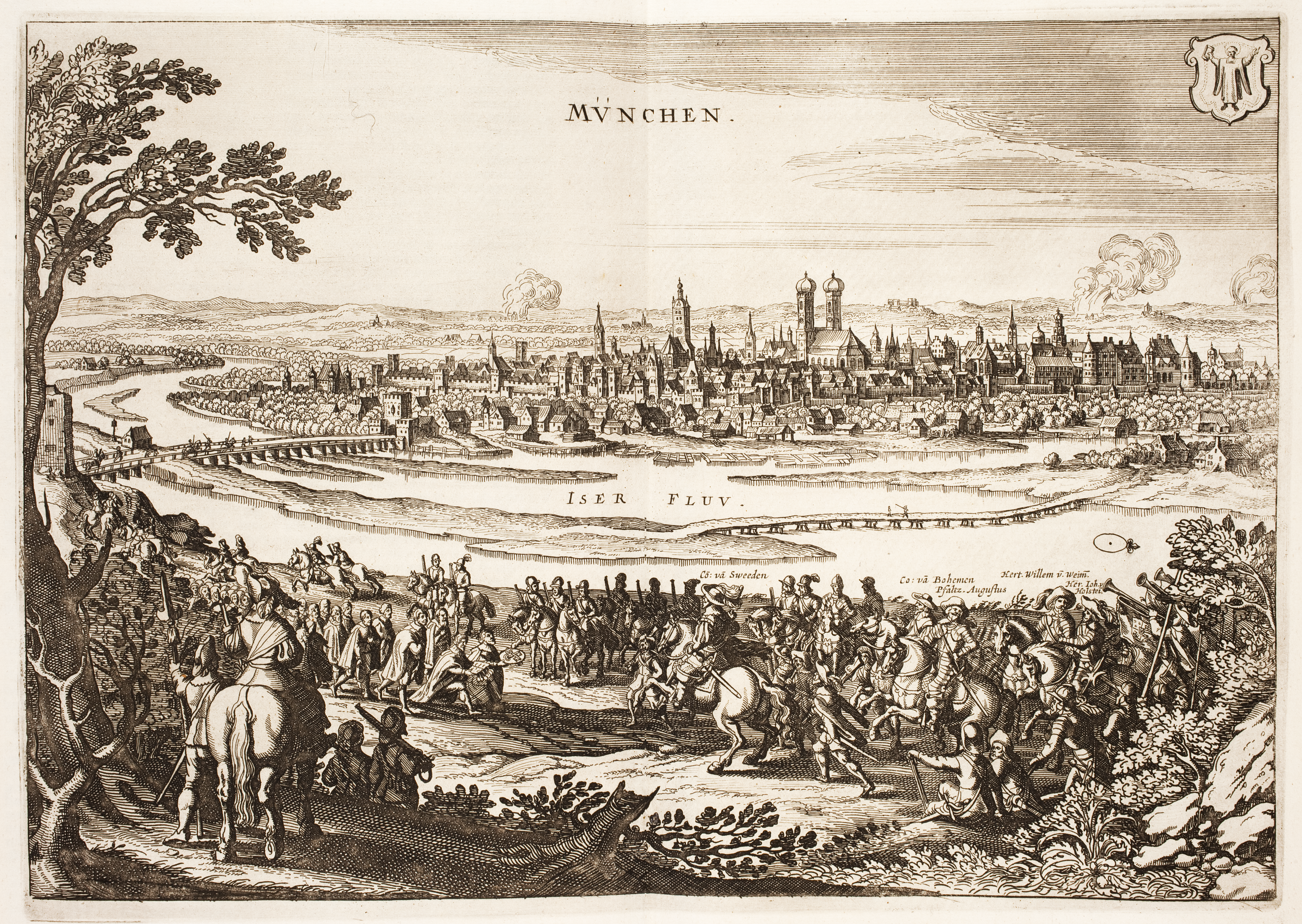
  In 1632 the Swedes occupied Munich.
- 1623 - Schleissheim Palace constructed.
- 1628 - Treaty of Munich signed.
- 1632 - City occupied by Gustavus Adolphus of Sweden.
- 1634 - Bubonic plague.
- 1638 - Mary's Column erected, Marienplatz.
- 1653 - State opera active.
- 1675 - Nymphenburg Palace built.
- 1680 - Population: 20,000
- 1688 - Premiere of Steffani's opera Niobe.
- 1690 - Theatine Church built.
- 1704 - Austrian occupation.
- 1705 - Sendlinger Mordweihnacht.
- 1739 - Amalienburg built.
- 1742 - Habsburgs in power until 1744.
- 1753 - Cuvilliés Theatre built.
- 1759 - Bavarian Academy of Sciences and Humanities founded.
- 1762
  - 28 April: Fire.
  - Hoforchester active.
- 1781 - Premiere of Mozart's opera Idomeneo.
- 1783 - Population: 38,000.
- 1789 - Englischer Garten laid out by Count Rumford.
- 1797 - Charitable soup kitchen begins operating.
- 1800 - 2 July: City taken by French forces.

== 19th century ==
- 1801 - Population - 48,885.
- 1806 - City becomes capital of Kingdom of Bavaria.
- 1807
  - Viktualienmarkt active.
  - Hofgartenkaserne built.
  - Augustiner-Keller beer garden in business.
- 1808 - Royal Academy of Fine Arts established.
- 1809 - Alte Münze in use.
- 1810 - Wiesnwirt (Oktoberfest) begins.
- 1818
  - National Theatre built.
  - Lese-Konditorei (reading cafe) in business.
- 1825 - Accession of Ludwig I of Bavaria leads to "handsome streets and buildings".

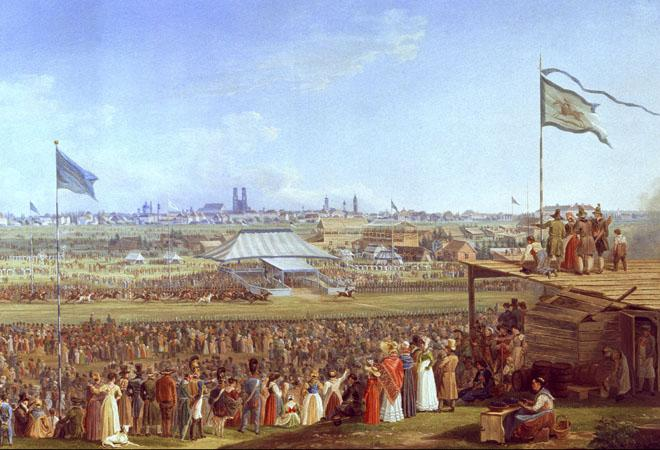
Oktoberfest in 1823

- 1826
  - LMU Munich relocates to Munich.
  - Türkenkaserne built.
- 1830
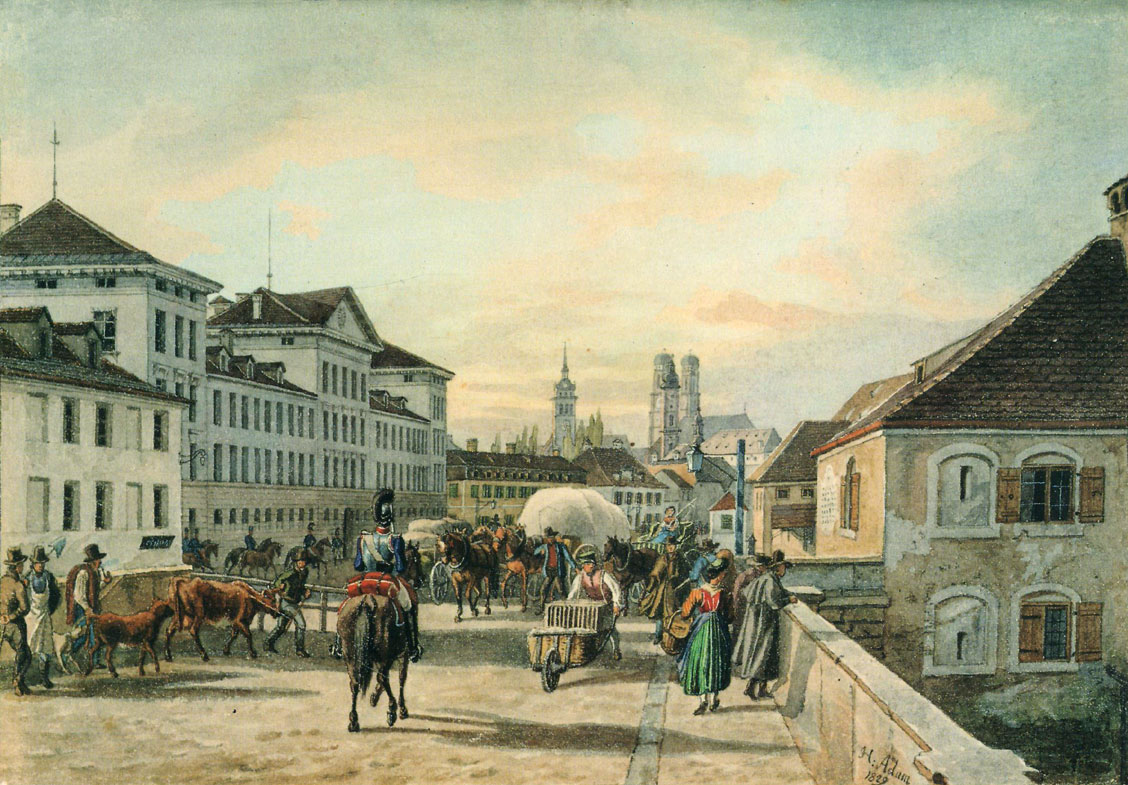
  Munich in 1829
  - Ludwigstraße laid out (approximate date).
  - Glyptothek built.
- 1835 - St. Boniface's Abbey founded by Ludwig I of Bavaria.
- 1836 - Alte Pinakothek established.
- 1837 - Allerheiligen-Hofkirche built.
- 1839 - Train station opens.
- 1843
  - State Library building constructed.
  - Paläontologisches Museum established.
- 1844
  - Ludwigskirche consecrated.
  - Feldherrnhalle constructed.
- 1848
  - München Hauptbahnhof relocated.
  - Daily newspaper Münchner Neueste Nachrichten first published.
- 1853
  - Maximilianstraße laid out.
  - Neue Pinakothek established.
- 1854 - Glaspalast built; city hosts General German Industrial Exhibition.
- 1855 - Bavarian National Museum founded.
- 1861 - Population: 148,201.
- 1862 - Propylaea constructed.
- 1865 - Premiere of Wagner's opera Tristan und Isolde.
- 1867 - Royal Bavarian Music School established.
- 1868
  - State Museum of Ethnology founded.
  - Technical University of Munich opened.
- 1869 - Museum für Abgüsse Klassischer Bildwerke created.
- 1871
  - Haidhausen station and München Süd station open.
  - Population: 169,693.
- 1875 - Munich Opera Festival begins.
- 1876 - Trams in Munich runs by horsecar.
- 1878 - Munich Pasing station relocated.
- 1879
  - Bavarian Army Museum founded.
  - Over 28 million gallons of beer were brewed in Munich.
- 1880
  - Bürgerliches Brauhaus formed.
  - Population: 230,023.
- 1882 - Allgemeine Zeitung moved to Munich.
- 1885
  - Bürgerbräukeller (beer hall) in business.
  - Population: 261,982.
- 1887
  - Hofatelier Elvira founded.
  - Café Luitpold opens.
- 1888 - Munich Stadtmuseum established.
- 1889 - Eisenbahnkaserne built.

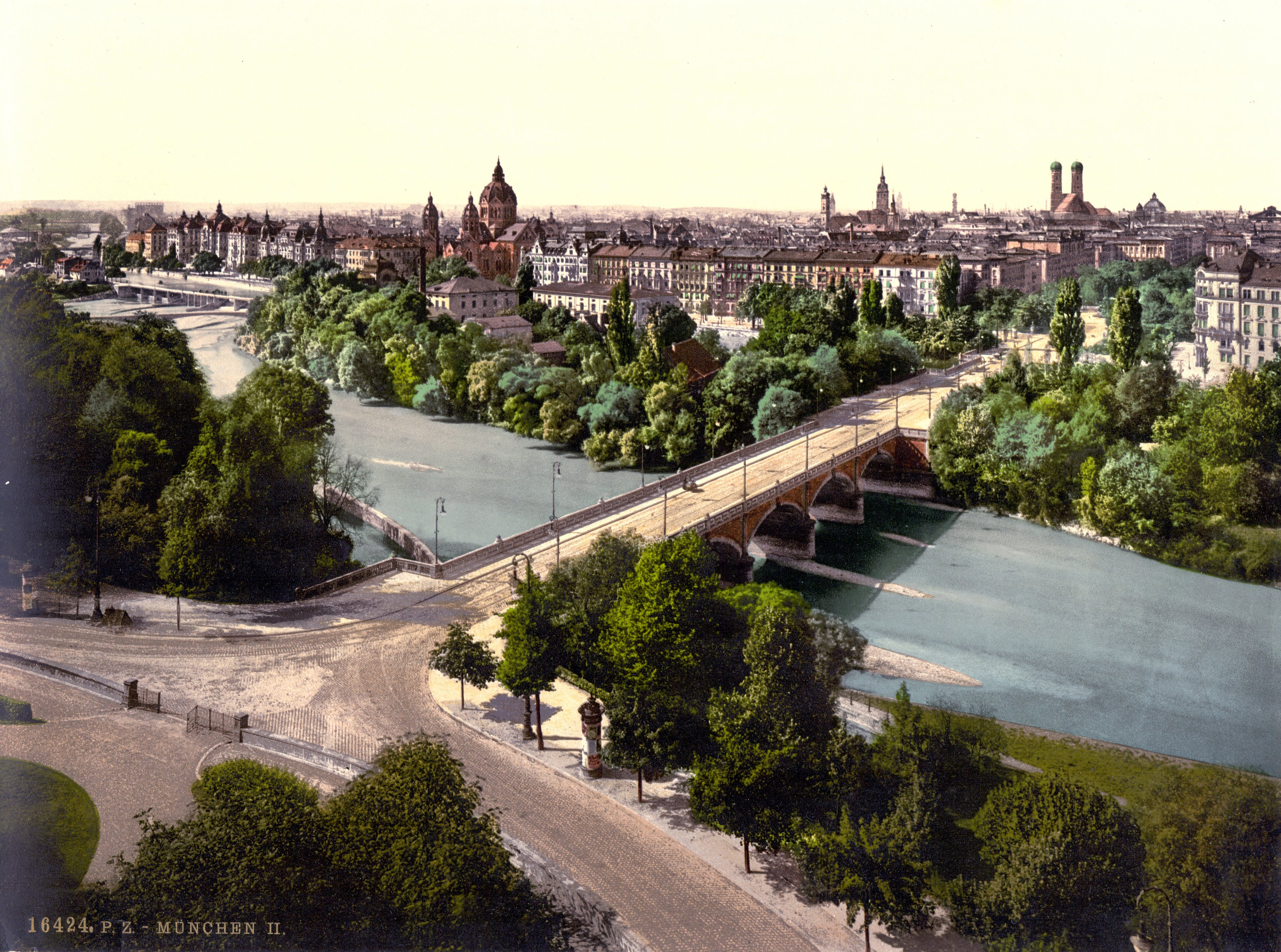
Munich in the 1890s

- 1890 - Population: 350,594.
- 1892
  - Rotkreuzklinikum München (hospital) opens.
  - Academic Alpine Club of Munich formed.
- 1893
  - Munich City Archives active.
  - Kaim Orchestra formed.
- 1894 -Production of Hildebrand & Wolfmüller motorcycle begins.
- 1895
  - Trams in Munich electrified.
  - Population: 407,174.
- 1896 - Simplicissimus magazine begins publication.
- 1898 - City hosts Kraft- und Arbeitsmaschinen-Ausstellung.
- 1900
  - FC Bayern Munich founded.
  - Künstlerhaus am Lenbachplatz opens.

== 20th century ==
=== 1900–1945 ===
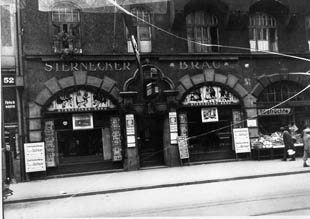
Sterneckerbräu, where Hitler attended his first German Workers' Party meeting on 12 September 1919 (photo 1925)

- 1901
  - Franz Eher publisher in business.
  - Prinzregententheater opens.
- 1902 - Anthropologisch-Prähistorisches Sammlung des Staates formed.
- 1903 - Deutsches Museum von Meisterwerken der Naturwissenschaft und Technik founded.
- 1904 - Heinrich Thannhauser's art gallery opens.
- 1905 - Population: 538,983.
- 1906 - City co-hosts the 1906 World Figure Skating Championships.
- 1908 - New Town Hall built; Rathaus-Glockenspiel installed.
- 1909
  - Neue Künstlervereinigung München founded.
  - Modern Gallery of contemporary art and Schackgalerie open.
- 1910 – 12 September: Premiere of Mahler's Symphony No. 8.
- 1911
  - Hellabrunn Zoo opens.
  - Der Blaue Reiter art exhibit held.
- 1917 - Bayerische Motoren Werke formed.
- 1919
  - German Workers' Party founded in Munich.
  - 16 October: Hitler gives his first political speech at the Hofbräukeller.
  - City becomes capital of Bavarian Soviet Republic.
  - Population: 630,711.
- 1920
  - July: Consulate of Poland opens.
  - Nazi paramilitary Sturmabteilung headquartered in Munich.
  - Nazi Völkischer Beobachter newspaper headquartered in Munich.
- 1923 - 8–9 November: Nazis attempt coup ("Beer Hall Putsch").
- 1925
  - Deutsche Verkehrsausstellung 1925 (transportation exposition) held in city.
  - München Hauptbahnhof electrified.
- 1927 - Richard Strauss Conservatory founded.
- 1929 - Lenbachhaus museum opens.
- 1930
  - 13 September: Hitler gives campaign speech at the Circus Krone Building, prior to German federal election, 1930 on 14 September.
  - Feinkost Käfer founded in Munich.
  - Population: 728,900.
- 1931 - National Socialist Party headquartered in Brown House.
- 1932
  - Nazi Sicherheitsdienst (intelligence agency) headquartered in Munich.
  - Zoologische Staatssammlung München formed.
- 1933
  - Nazi headquarters relocated from Munich to Berlin.
  - March: Dachau concentration camp begins operating near city.
- 1934 - Hunting museum established.
- 1935 - Münchner Haus der Kulturinstitute built.

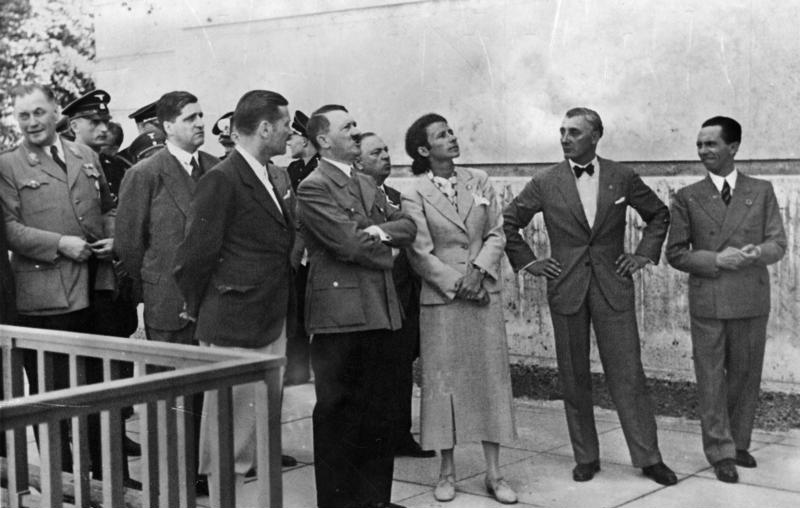
Adolf Hitler visits the House of German Art in 1937.

- 1937
  - Führerbau constructed.
  - 18 July: House of German Art opens.
  - 19 July: "Degenerate art" exhibit held in Hofgarten.
- 1938
  - September: Munich Agreement signed.
  - November: Kristallnacht.
- 1939
  - Munich-Riem Airport opens.
  - Population: 829,318.
- 1940
  - June: Bombing of Munich begins.
- 1942
  - 27 June: White Rose group active.
  - 17 December: Forced labour camp for men established in the Moosach district.
- 1943
  - February: Munich-Allach subcamp of the Dachau concentration camp established by the SS.
  - Polenlager Ost and Polenlager Süd forced labour subcamps of the local Nazi prison for youth established for young Poles (see also Nazi crimes against the Polish nation).
- 1944
  - 5 August: Forced labour camp for women established in the Berg am Laim district.
  - Agfa-Commando subcamp of the Dachau concentration camp established.
  - 2 December: Forced labour camp for women in Berg am Laim dissolved.

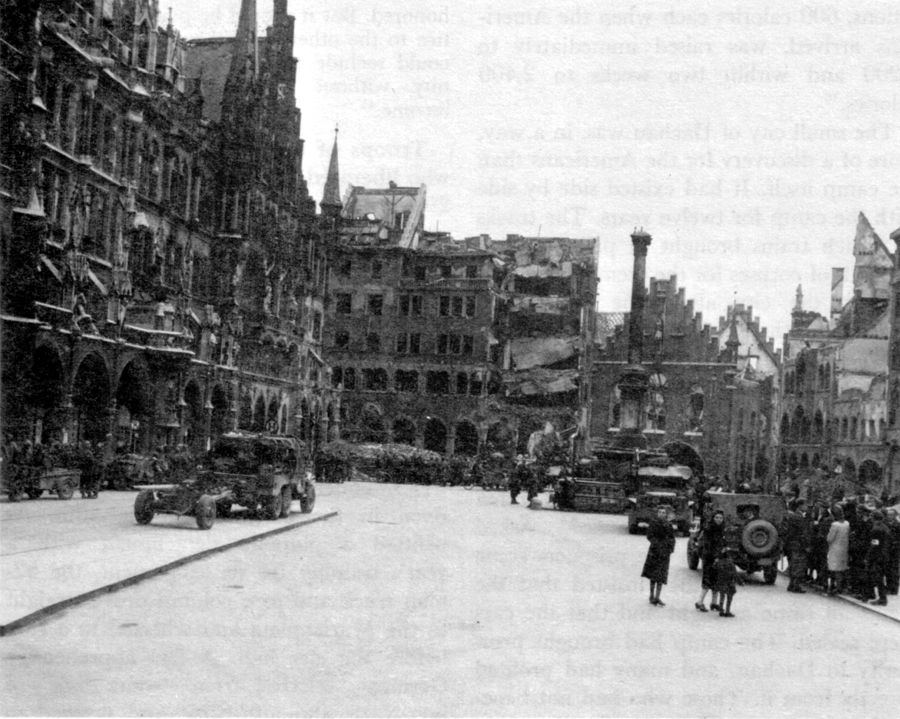
War destruction in 1945

- 1945
  - 13 March: Forced labour camp for men in Moosach dissolved.
  - City captured by Americans. Remaining prisoners of the Munich-Allach and Agfa-Commando subcamps liberated.
  - AFN Munich begins broadcasting.
  - Munich Central Collecting Point set up.
  - Denazification.
  - Christian Social Union in Bavaria headquartered in Munich.

=== 1946-1990s ===
- 1948 - Bayerische Akademie der Schönen Künste established.
- 1949 - Bavarian Radio Symphony Orchestra founded.
- 1951 - Residenz Theatre built.
- 1952 - Deutsches Brauereimuseum founded.
- 1954 - Population: 908,572.
- 1955
  - Italian Cultural Institute in Munich founded.
  - Fast-food Wienerwald (restaurant) in business.
- 1958
  - 6 February: Munich air disaster.
  - Population: 1,011,878.
- 1959 - Munich Book Fair begins.
- 1960
  - Munich Central Station rebuilt.
  - Convair 340 crash.
- 1961 - Population: 1,106,298.
- 1963 - National Theatre rebuilt.
- 1965 - Population: 1,214,603.
- 1966
  - Staatliche Sammlung für Ägyptische Kunst founded.
  - Deutsches Jagdmuseum reopens.
- 1967 - Staatliche Antikensammlungen opens.
- 1969 - City hosts the 1969 World Table Tennis Championships.
- 1970
  - Munich bus attack
  - Population: 1,311,978.
- 1971 - U-Bahn begins operating.
- 1972
  - S-Bahn begins operating.
  - Olympic Stadium opens; city hosts Summer Olympics; Munich massacre.
  - BMW Headquarters is established.
- 1973 - Islamic Center of Munich built.
- 1974 - City hosts the 1974 World Figure Skating Championships.
- 1975 - City co-hosts the 1975 Ice Hockey World Championships.

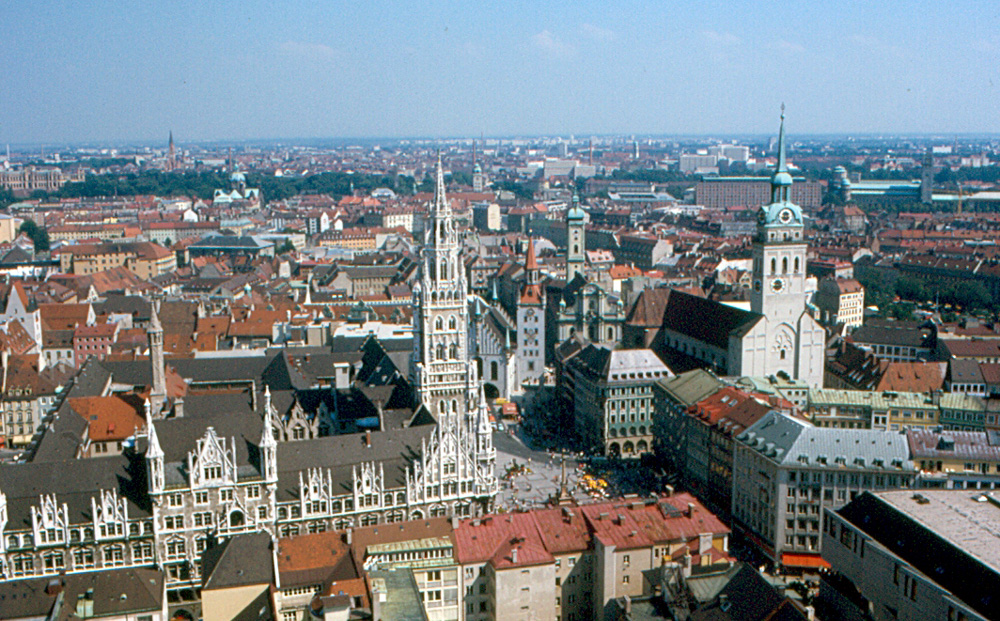
Munich Old Town in 1976

- 1978 - Population: 1,296,970.
- 1980 - Museum Witt established; Oktoberfest bombing.
- 1983
  - April–May: City co-hosts the 1983 Ice Hockey World Championships.
  - City hosts Bundesgartenschau (garden show).
  - City hosts the Eurovision Song Contest 1983.
- 1985 - Gasteig culture center opens.
- 1988 - Munich Biennale opera festival begins.
- 1989 - Sister city relationship established with Cincinnati, USA.
- 1990 - Museum of Man and Nature opens.
- 1992
  - City hosts 18th G7 summit.
  - Museum Villa Stuck opens.
  - Munich Airport opens.
- 1993
  - Bayerische Staatskanzlei built.
  - Bayerische Theaterakademie August Everding founded.
- 1995 - Eureka Prometheus Project's VaMP driverless car goes to Copenhagen and back.
- 1996 - City website online (approximate date).
- 1999
  - Czech Centre in Munich founded.
  - BMW Headquarters declared as protected historical building
- 2000 - Bayerische Staatssammlung für Paläontologie und Geologie formed.

== 21st century ==
- 2001 - City hosts the 2001 World Judo Championships.
- 2002 - Pinakothek der Moderne opens.
- 2003 - Goetz Collection opens.
- 2005 - Allianz Arena opens.
- 2006 - Ohel Jakob synagogue built.
- 2007
  - Jewish Museum opens.
  - Population: 1,311,573.
- 2009 - Museum Brandhorst opens.
- 2010 - Türkentor restored.
- 2012 - March: 2012 Munich artworks discovery.
- 2013 - Population: 1,407,836.
- 2014 - Dieter Reiter becomes mayor.
- 2015
  - Migrants arrive.
  - NS-Dokumentationszentrum (Munich Documentation Centre for the History of National Socialism) opens.
- 2016 - Munich shooting occurs.
- 2024 - 2024 Munich shooting
- 2025 - 2025 Munich car attack

== See also ==
- History of Munich
- List of mayors of Munich
- Timeline of German history
- Timelines of other cities in the state of Bavaria: Augsburg, Nuremberg, Würzburg

== Bibliography ==
=== in English ===
- Edward Augustus Domeier (1830), "Munich", Descriptive Road-Book of Germany, London: Samuel Leigh, hdl:2027/hvd.hx167e
- Munich and Environs. Grieben's Travelling-Bibliothek (10th ed.). Berlin: Albert Goldschmidt. 1866.
- William Henry Overall, ed. (1870). "Munich". Dictionary of Chronology. London: William Tegg. hdl:2027/uc2.ark:/13960/t9m32q949.
- George Henry Townsend (1877), "Munich", Manual of Dates (5th ed.), London: Frederick Warne & Co., hdl:2027/wu.89097349427 – via HathiTrust
- Muirhead, James Fullarton (1884). "Munich" . Encyclopædia Britannica. Vol. 17 (9th ed.).
- "Munich", Southern Germany and Austria, including Hungary and Transylvania (6th ed.), Leipsic: Karl Baedeker, 1887
- "Munich" . Encyclopædia Britannica. Vol. 19 (11th ed.). 1910.
- Benjamin Vincent (1910), "Munich", Haydn's Dictionary of Dates (25th ed.), London: Ward, Lock & Co., hdl:2027/loc.ark:/13960/t89g6g776 – via HathiTrust
- Henry Rawle Wadleigh (1910), Munich, history, monuments, and art, London: T.F. Unwin, OL 7199297M
- Guide to Munich, Bruckmann's Illustrated Guides (40th ed.), Munich: A. Bruckmann, 1914, OL 14010636M
- Gavriel D. Rosenfeld (2000). Munich and Memory: Architecture, Monuments, and the Legacy of the Third Reich. University of California Press. ISBN 978-0-520-92302-7.
- John M. Jeep, ed. (2001). "Munich". Medieval Germany: an Encyclopedia. Garland Publishing. ISBN 0-8240-7644-3.

=== in German ===
- Trautmann, Karl; Reinhardstöttner, Karl von (1887), Jahrbuch für Münchener Geschichte [Annual review of Munich history] (in German), pp. 5 v 1887-
- "Munchen". Brockhaus' Konversations-Lexikon (in German). Vol. 12 (14th ed.). Leipzig: Brockhaus. 1896. hdl:2027/njp.32101064064494.
- P. Krauss und E. Uetrecht, ed. (1913). "Munchen". Meyers Deutscher Städteatlas [Meyer's Atlas of German Cities] (in German). Leipzig: Bibliographisches Institut.
