= Gerdy Troost =

German architect and designer

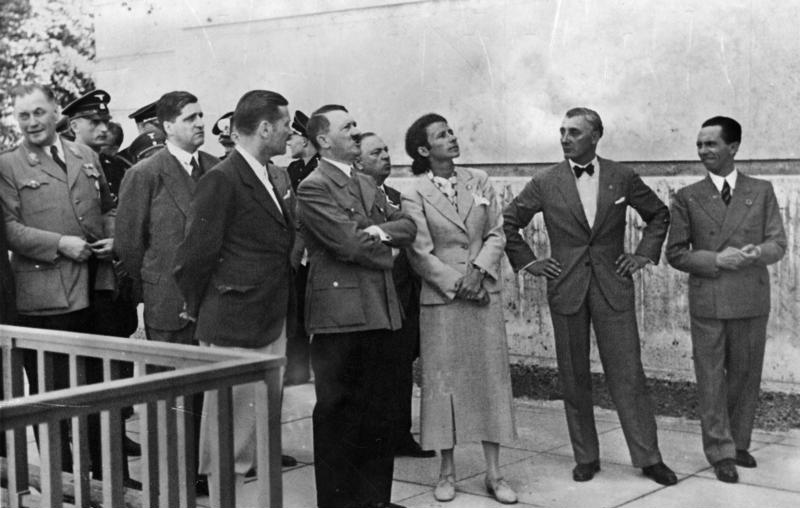
Adolf Hitler, Gerdy Troost, Adolf Ziegler, and Joseph Goebbels on a tour of the Haus der Deutschen Kunst, 5 May 1937

Gerhardine "Gerdy" Troost (née Andresen; 3 March 1904 – 30 January 2003), was a German architect, interior designer, interior decorator, and the wife of Paul Troost.

== Life and work ==
Troost was born in Stuttgart, the daughter of the architect Johannes Andresen. After completing her education, she worked in her father's business, where she met Paul Ludwig Troost in 1923. In 1924, the pair moved to Munich and were married there in 1925. Through her husband, she became acquainted with Adolf Hitler in 1930 and became a member of the Nazi Party in 1932.

After her husband's death in 1934, Troost ran his architectural and design business together with his former partner, Leonhard Gall. She supervised the construction of the Haus der Kunst, the remodeling of the Königsplatz, and the construction of the Ehrentempels.

Troost was responsible for the interior renovations of Hitler's official and private residences during the Third Reich, including the Old Chancellery in Berlin, the Berghof on the Obersalzberg, and his Munich apartment.

In 1937 she was part of the jury for the first Greater German Art Exhibition. When Hitler rejected her selections, she resigned from the jury. She was replaced by Heinrich Hoffmann, who made selections more to Hitler's liking.

She remained an architectural and design adviser to Hitler's circle up to the end of the war. In 1943, she received from Hitler an endowment of 100,000 Reichsmarks. Troost was one of the few people who actively disagreed with Hitler without fear of being fired or arrested. Hitler listened to Troost about art and architecture.

In 1946, Troost was included on the Art Looting Investigation Unit's Red Flag Names List connected to Nazi art looting networks.

During denazification she was classified as "less responsible" (Minderbelastete) by the Hauptspruchkammer and sentenced to a fine of 500 DM and a 10-year Berufsverbot. At the end of the period, Troost resumed work and resided in Schützing, a town on the Chiemsee in Upper Bavaria.

Gerdy Troost remained a friend and confidante of Winifred Wagner after 1945. She died in Bad Reichenhall at the age of 98 on 30 January 2003.

== In media ==
Despina Stratigakos’s publications on Nazi Germany have brought previously unknown histories to light, including the influential role of Troost.

Troost is depicted in Philip Kerr's thriller Prussian Blue (2017) as a confidante both of Hitler and of the Berlin detective Bernie Gunther as he tries to track down the author of a number of murders in the area of the Berghof.
