= Reich Chancellery =

Berlin building housing the Chancellor of Germany, 1878–1945

- Reichskanzlei
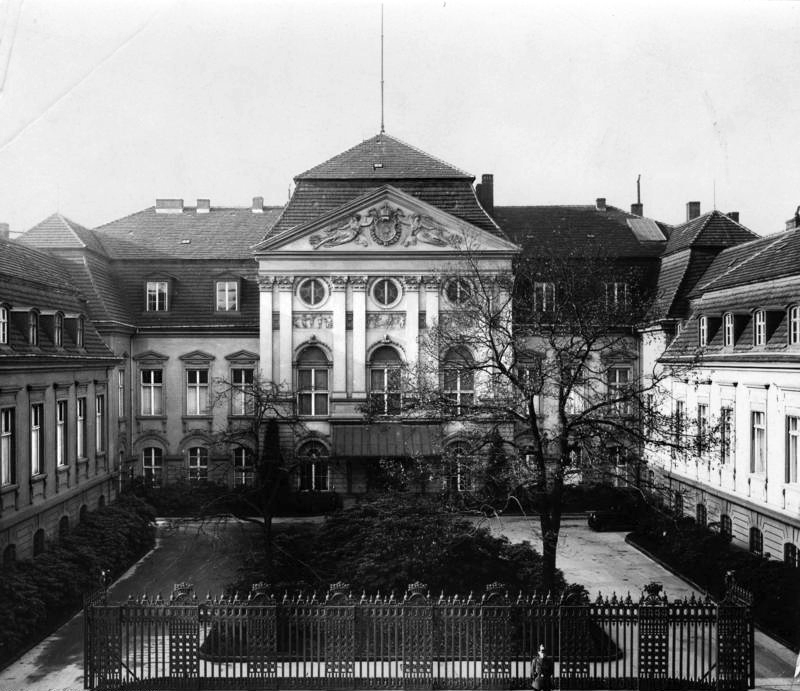
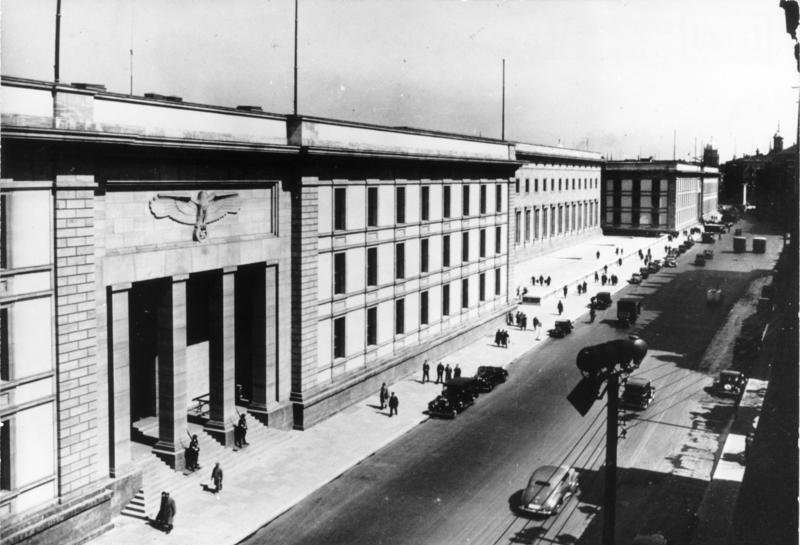
- Top: The main building and the small courtyard of the Old Reich Chancellery at Wilhelmstraße. Bottom: The entrance on Voßstraße to the Nazi era New Reich Chancellery.

General information
- Location: Wilhelmstraße 77, Berlin-Mitte, Germany
- Coordinates: 52°30′42″N 13°22′55″E
- Completed: 1939
- Renovated: 1939
- Destroyed: 1945

Design and construction
- Architect: Carl Friedrich Richter

The Reich Chancellery (German: Reichskanzlei) was the traditional name of the office of the Chancellor of Germany (then called Reichskanzler) in the period of the German Reich from 1878 to 1945. The Chancellery's seat, selected and prepared since 1875, was the former city palace of Adolf Friedrich Count von der Schulenburg (1685–1741) and later Prince Antoni Radziwiłł (1775–1833) on Wilhelmstraße in Berlin. Both the palace and a new Reich Chancellery building (completed in early 1939) were seriously damaged during World War II and subsequently demolished.

Today the office of the German chancellor is usually called Kanzleramt (Chancellor's Office), or more formally Bundeskanzleramt (Federal Chancellor's Office). The latter is also the name of the new seat of the Chancellor's Office, completed in 2001.

== Old Reich Chancellery ==
When the military alliance of the North German Confederation was reorganised as a federal state with effect from July 1, 1867, the office of a Federal Chancellor (Bundeskanzler) was implemented at Berlin and staffed with the Prussian Prime Minister Otto von Bismarck. After the unification of Germany on January 18, 1871, by accession of the South German states, Bismarck became Reich Chancellor of the new German Empire.

In 1869, the Prussian state government had acquired the Rococo city palace of late Prince Radziwiłł on Wilhelmstraße No. 77 (former "Palais Schulenburg"), which from 1875 was refurbished as the official building of the Chancellery. It was inaugurated with the meetings of the Berlin Congress in July 1878, followed by the Congo Conference in 1884.

In the days of the Weimar Republic the Chancellery was significantly enlarged by the construction of a Modern southern annex finished in 1930. In 1932/33, while his nearby office on Wilhelmstraße No. 73 was renovated, the building also served as the residence of Reich President Paul von Hindenburg, where he appointed Adolf Hitler chancellor on 30 January 1933. The Hitler Cabinet held few meetings here. In 1935, the architects Paul Troost and Leonhard Gall redesigned the interior as Hitler's domicile. They also added a large reception hall/ballroom and conservatory, officially known as the Festsaal mit Wintergarten in the garden area. The latter addition was unique because of the large cellar that led a further one-and-a-half meters down to an air-raid shelter known as the Vorbunker. Once completed in 1936, it was officially called the "Reich Chancellery Air-Raid Shelter" until 1943, with the construction to expand the bunker complex with the addition of the Führerbunker, located one level below. The two bunkers were connected by a stairway set at right angles which could be closed off from each other.

Devastated by air raids and almost completely destroyed during the Battle of Berlin, the ruins of the Old Reich Chancellery were not cleared until 1950.

== New Reich Chancellery ==
In late January 1938, Adolf Hitler officially assigned his favourite architect, Albert Speer, to build the New Reich Chancellery around the corner on Voßstraße, a western branch-off of Wilhelmstraße, requesting that the building be completed within a year. Hitler commented that Bismarck's Old Chancellery was "fit for a soap company" and not suitable as headquarters of a Greater German Reich. It nevertheless remained his official residence, where Hitler lived in the so-called Führerwohnung ("Leader apartment"). The Old and New Chancellery shared a large garden area, with the underground Führerbunker, where Hitler ultimately committed suicide at the end of April 1945.

Hitler placed the entire northern side of the Voßstraße at Speer's disposal, assigning him the work of creating grand halls and salons which "will make an impression on people". Speer was given a blank cheque—Hitler stated that the cost of the project was immaterial—and was instructed that the building be of solid construction, and that it be finished by the following January in time for the next New Year's diplomatic reception to be held in the new building.

Speer claimed in his autobiography that he had completed the task of clearing the site, designing, constructing, and furnishing the building in less than a year. In fact, preliminary planning and versions of the designs were already being worked on as early as 1935. To clear the space for the New Reich Chancellery, the buildings on the northern side of Voßstraße No. 2–10 had been demolished in 1937.

Over 4,500 people worked in shifts, so that progress could be made around the clock. The immense construction was finished 48 hours ahead of schedule, and the project earned Speer a reputation as a good organiser, which played a part in the architect becoming Armaments Minister and a director of forced labour later in the war. Speer recalls that the whole work force—masons, carpenters, plumbers, etc. were invited to inspect the finished building. Hitler then addressed the workers in the Sportpalast; interior fittings, however, were not finished until the early 1940s. In the end, the project cost over 90 million Reichsmarks (equivalent to 400 million 2021 €), and hosted the various ministries of the Reich.

In his memoirs, Speer described the impression of the Reichskanzlei on a visitor:

From Wilhelmsplatz an arriving diplomat drove through great gates into a court of honour. By way of an outside staircase he first entered a medium-sized reception room from which double doors almost 5.2 m (17 ft) high opened into a large hall clad in mosaic. He then ascended several steps, passed through a round room with domed ceiling, and saw before him a gallery 150 m (490 ft) long. Hitler was particularly impressed by my gallery because it was twice as long as the Hall of Mirrors at Versailles. Hitler was delighted: "On the long walk from the entrance to the reception hall they'll get a taste of the power and grandeur of the German Reich!" During the next several months he asked to see the plans again and again but interfered remarkably little in this building, even though it was designed for him personally. He let me work freely.

The series of rooms constituting the approach to Hitler's reception gallery were decorated with a rich variety of materials and colours, and totalled 221 m (725 ft) in length. The gallery itself was 147.5 m (484 ft) long. Hitler's own office was 400 m^{2} (4,300 sq ft) in size. From the outside, the chancellery had a stern, authoritarian appearance. From the Wilhelmplatz, guests would enter the Chancellery through the Court of Honour (Ehrenhof). The building's main entrance was flanked by two bronze statues by sculptor Arno Breker: "Wehrmacht" and "Die Partei" ("Armed Forces" and "The Party"). Hitler is said to have been greatly impressed by the building and was uncharacteristically free in his praise for Speer, lauding the architect as a "genius". The chancellor's great study was a particular favourite of the dictator. In it there stood a grand marble-topped table, which remained generally decorative up until 1944, when it served as an important part of the Nazi leader's military headquarters; the study being used for military conferences. On the other hand, the Cabinet room was never used for its intended purpose.

The New Reich Chancellery suffered severe damage during the Battle of Berlin between April and May 1945 (in comparison, the Old Reich Chancellery was not as badly damaged). Andrei Gromyko, who would later become the Soviet foreign minister, visited the partially-destroyed structure a few weeks after the fighting in the city had completely ceased. He recalls, "We reached it not without difficulties. Ruined edifices, formless heaps of metal and ferro-concrete encumbered the way. To the very entrance of the Chancellery, the car could not approach. We had to reach it on foot..." He noted the New Reich Chancellery "...was almost destroyed... Only the walls remained, riddled by countless shrapnel, yawning by big shot-holes from shells. Ceilings survived only partly. Windows loomed black by emptiness."

The last stage of defense by defending German troops took place inside the Reich Chancellery, as mentioned by Gromyko, who stated the following:

Doors, windows and chandeliers testified on them the big imprint of the battle, most of them being broken. The lowest floors of the Reich Chancellery represented chaos. Obviously, the garrison of the Citadel fiercely resisted here... All around lie heaps of crossbeams and overhead covers, both metal and wood and huge pieces of ferro-concrete. On both sides of a narrow corridor, there were certain disposed cells, all eroded by explosions… All this produced a grim and distressing impression. If photography of this underground citadel of Hitler existed, they would become a proper illustration to Dante's Hell; just select which circle.

After World War II in Europe ended, the remains in what was then East Berlin (the Soviet-occupied sector of a divided Berlin) were demolished by the order of the Soviet occupation forces. Parts of the building's marble walls were rumoured to have been used in the building of the Soviet war memorial located in Treptower Park, or to renovate and repair the nearby war-damaged Mohrenstraße U-Bahn station. Petrographic analyses of materials used for construction there did not confirm those rumours. Some of the so-called "red marble" (actually limestone) obtained from the demolition of the New Reich Chancellery was also supposedly used in the construction of the Moscow Metro's palatial-style stations after the war. Also, it is alleged that a heater from one of Hitler's rooms was placed in a Protestant hospital located not too far away from the Reich Chancellery.

While the western half of the plot was used by the East German government for the establishment of the so-called "Death-Strip" adjacent to the Berlin Wall in 1961 (when the barrier was being constructed), a Plattenbau apartment block, together with a kindergarten, was built on the eastern half (along Wilhelmstraße) during the 1980s.

=== Gallery ===
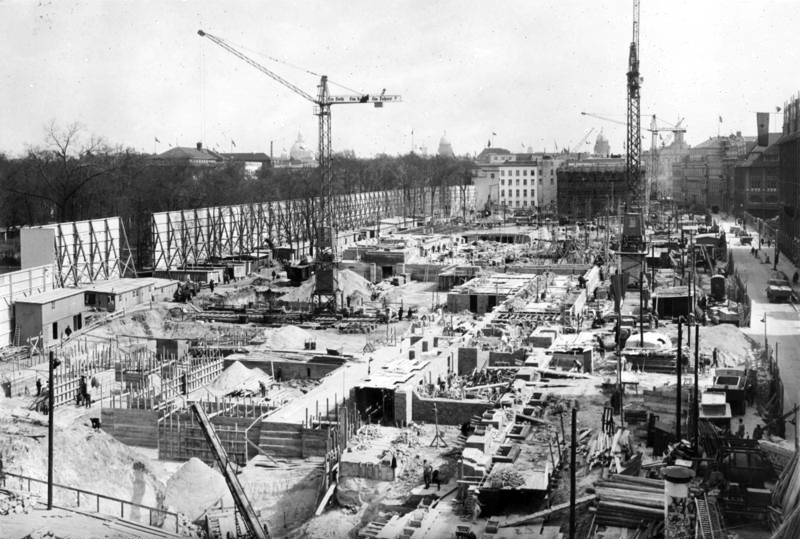
The New Reich Chancellery under construction in 1938

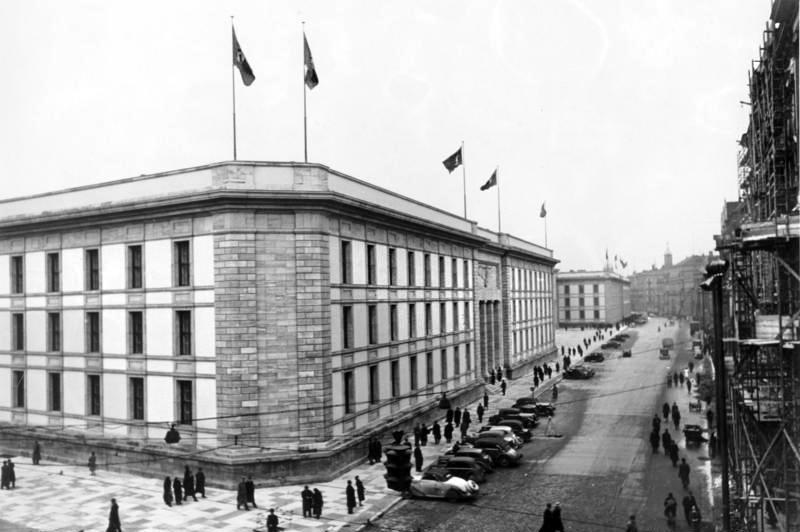
The New Reich Chancellery, pictured here on the junction of Hermann-Göring-Straße (now Ebertstraße) and Voßstraße in 1939

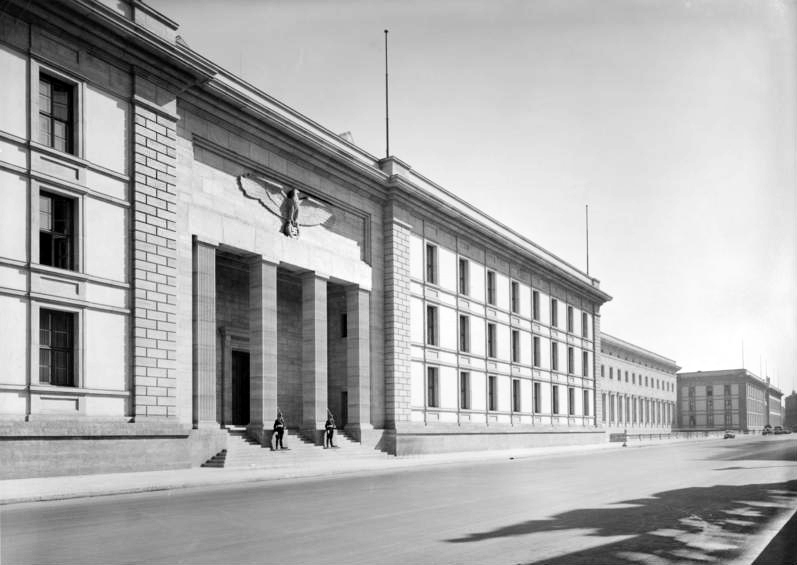
The New Reich Chancellery as pictured on Voss Street in 1939

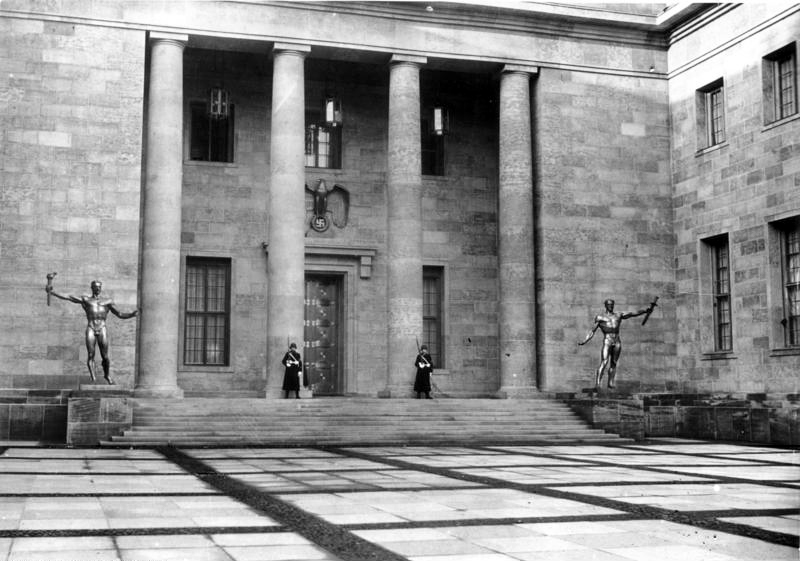
The New Reich Chancellery's Courtyard of Honor in 1939. The main entrance was flanked by Arno Breker's two bronze statues Die Wehrmacht and Die Partei ("The Armed Forces" and "The Party")

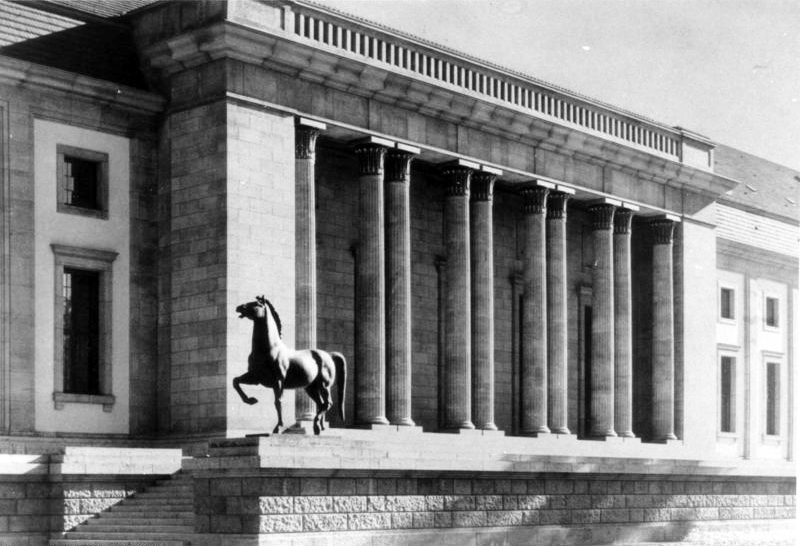
The New Reich Chancellery's garden portal (gateway) in 1939

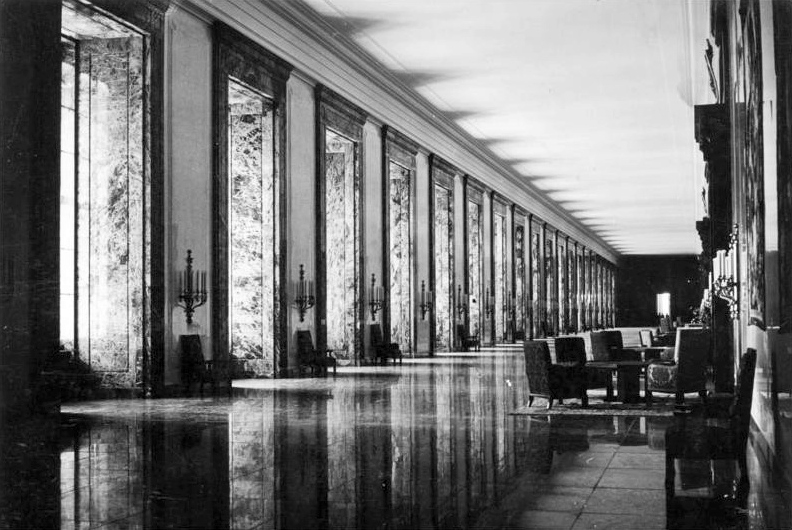
The New Reich Chancellery's grand marble gallery in 1939

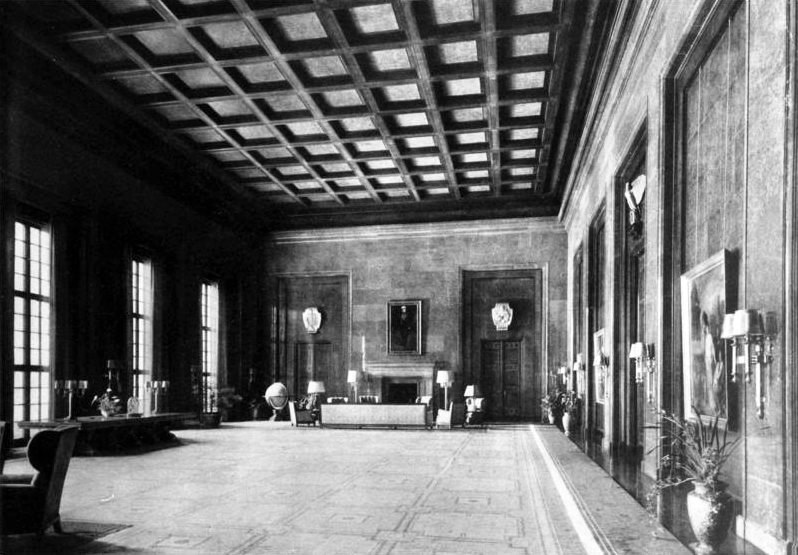
The New Reich Chancellery's work-study office/room for Hitler in 1939

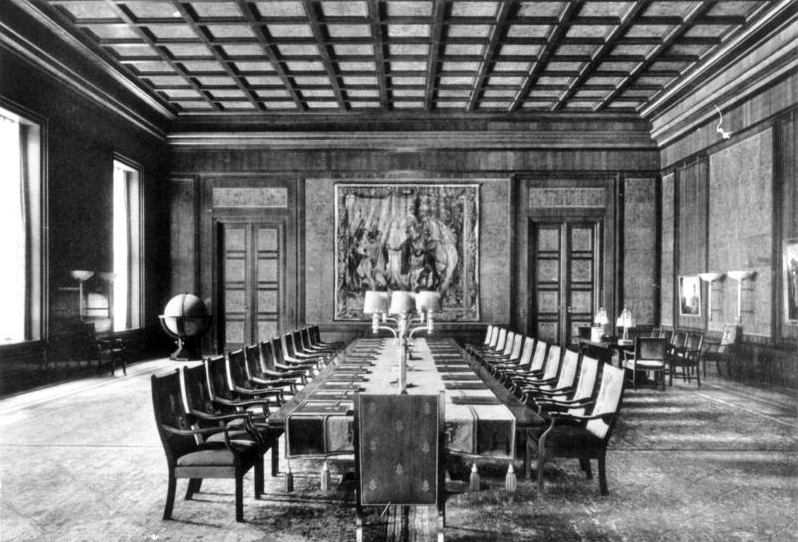
The New Reich Chancellery's Reich government chamber (cabinet room) in 1939

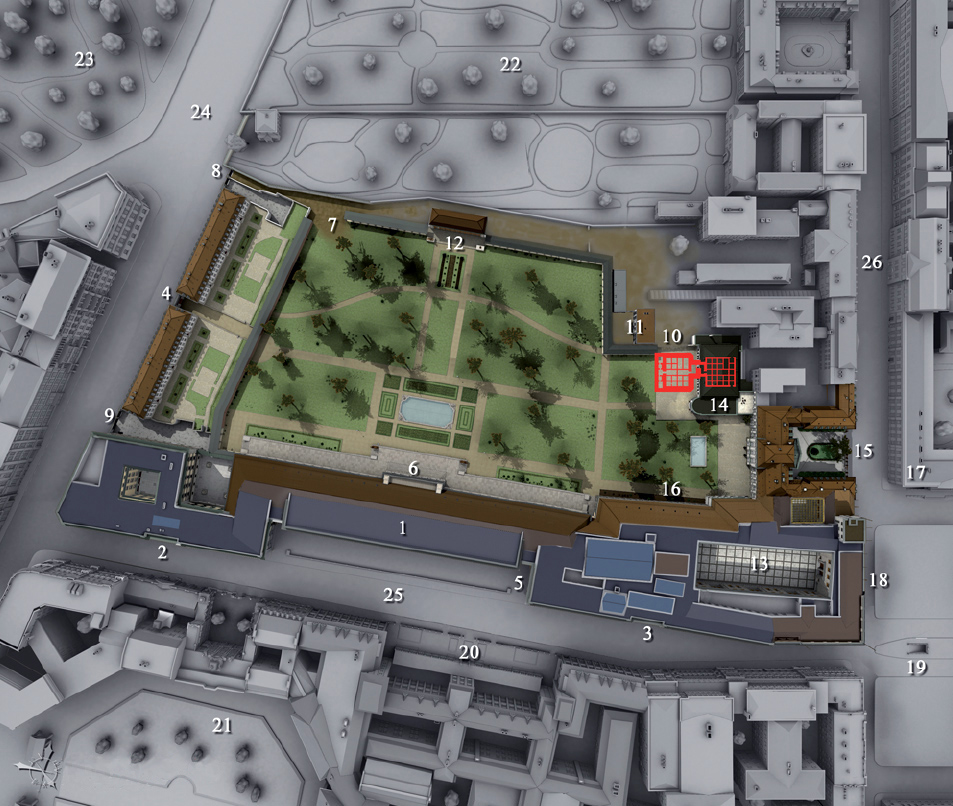
The location of the Old (15) and the New Reich Chancellery (1), together with the Vorbunker and the Führerbunker (red, 10), between Hermann-Göring-Straße (24) Voßstraße (25) and Wilhelmstraße (26)

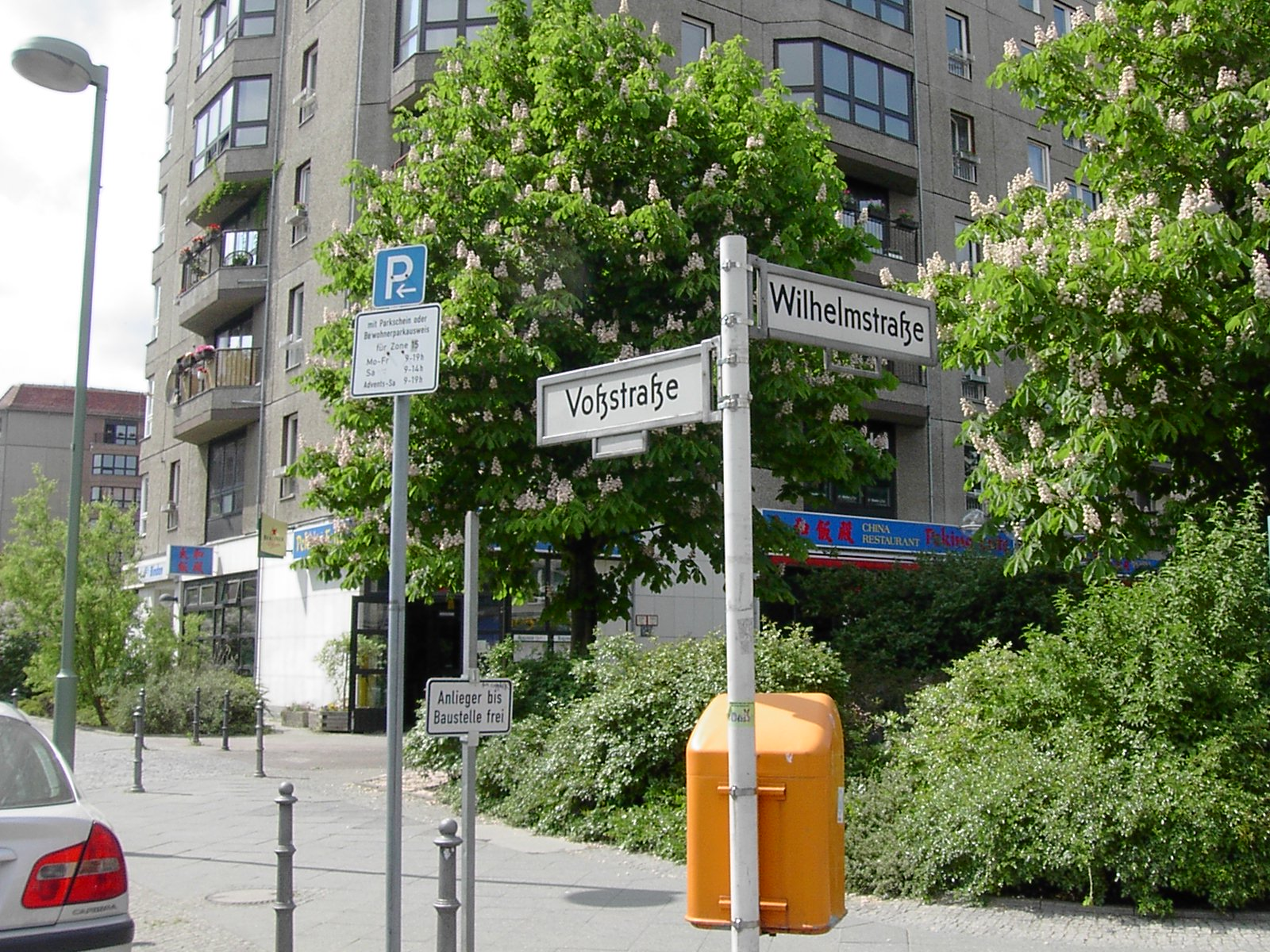
The corner of Wilhelmstraße and Voßstraße today, now occupied by an apartment block and a Chinese restaurant

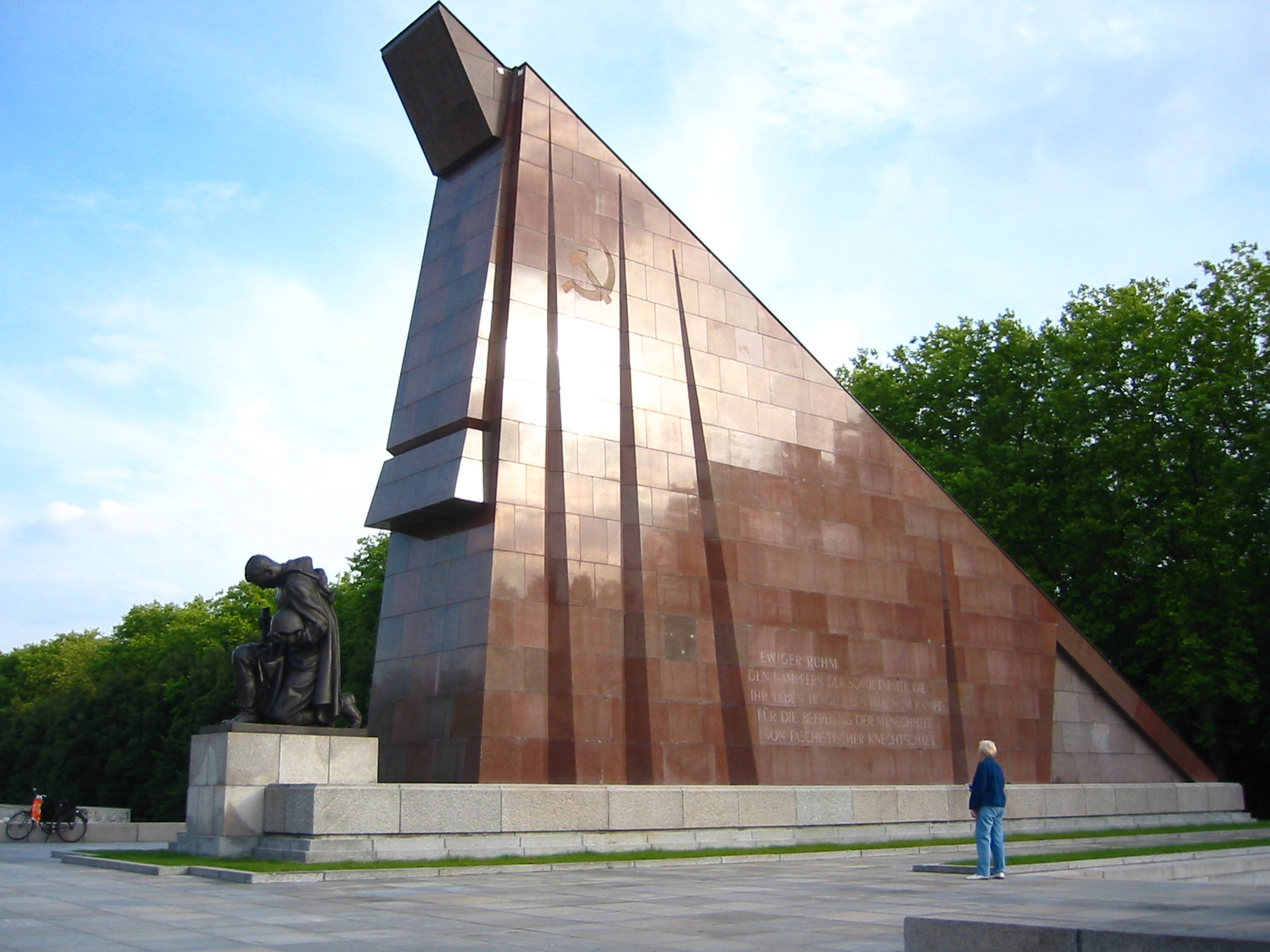
A part of the Soviet War Memorial at Treptower Park, supposedly built from red marble – actually granite – which was said to be taken from the ruins of the New Reich Chancellery

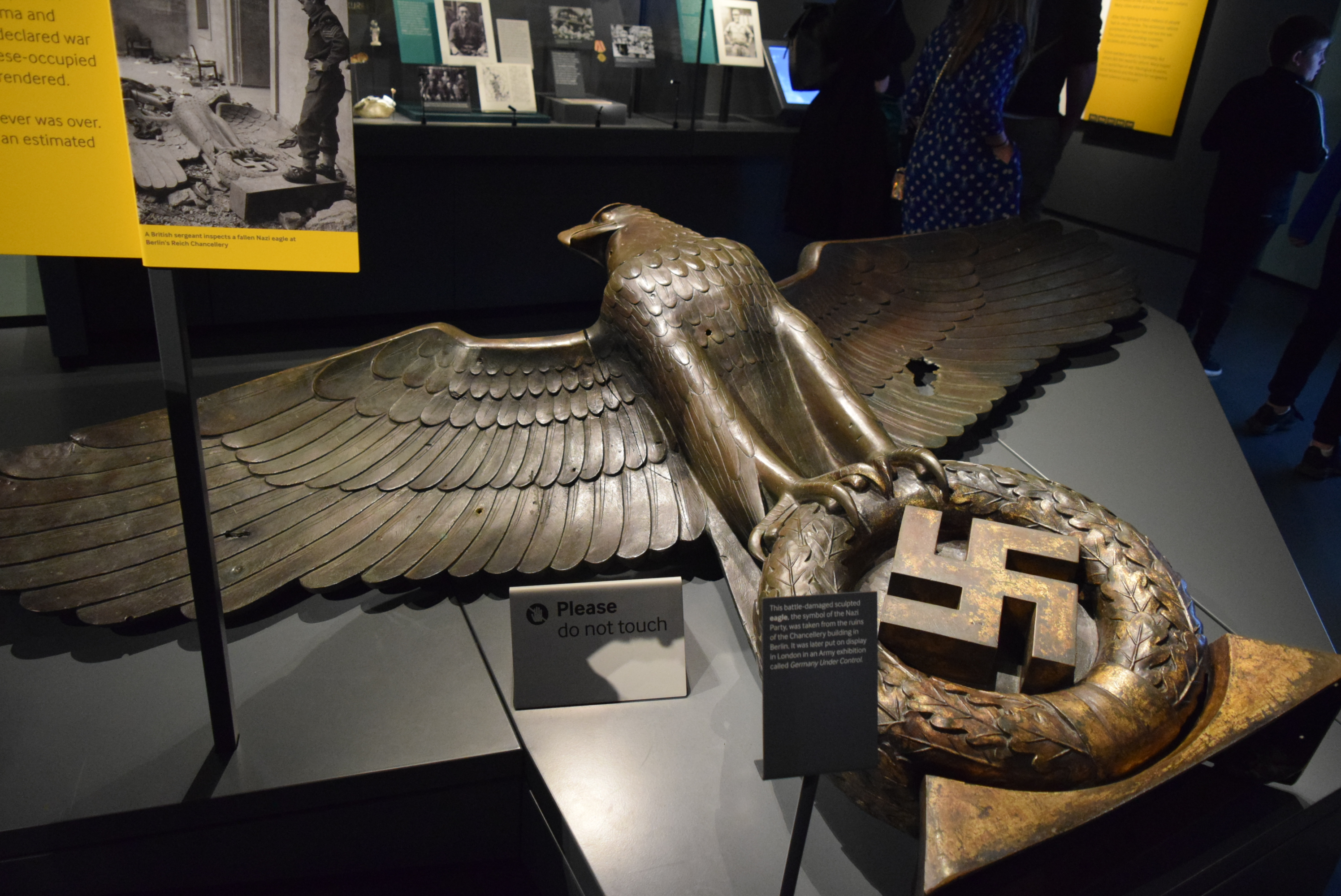
A bronze Nazi eagle from the New Reich Chancellery on display at the Imperial War Museum in London

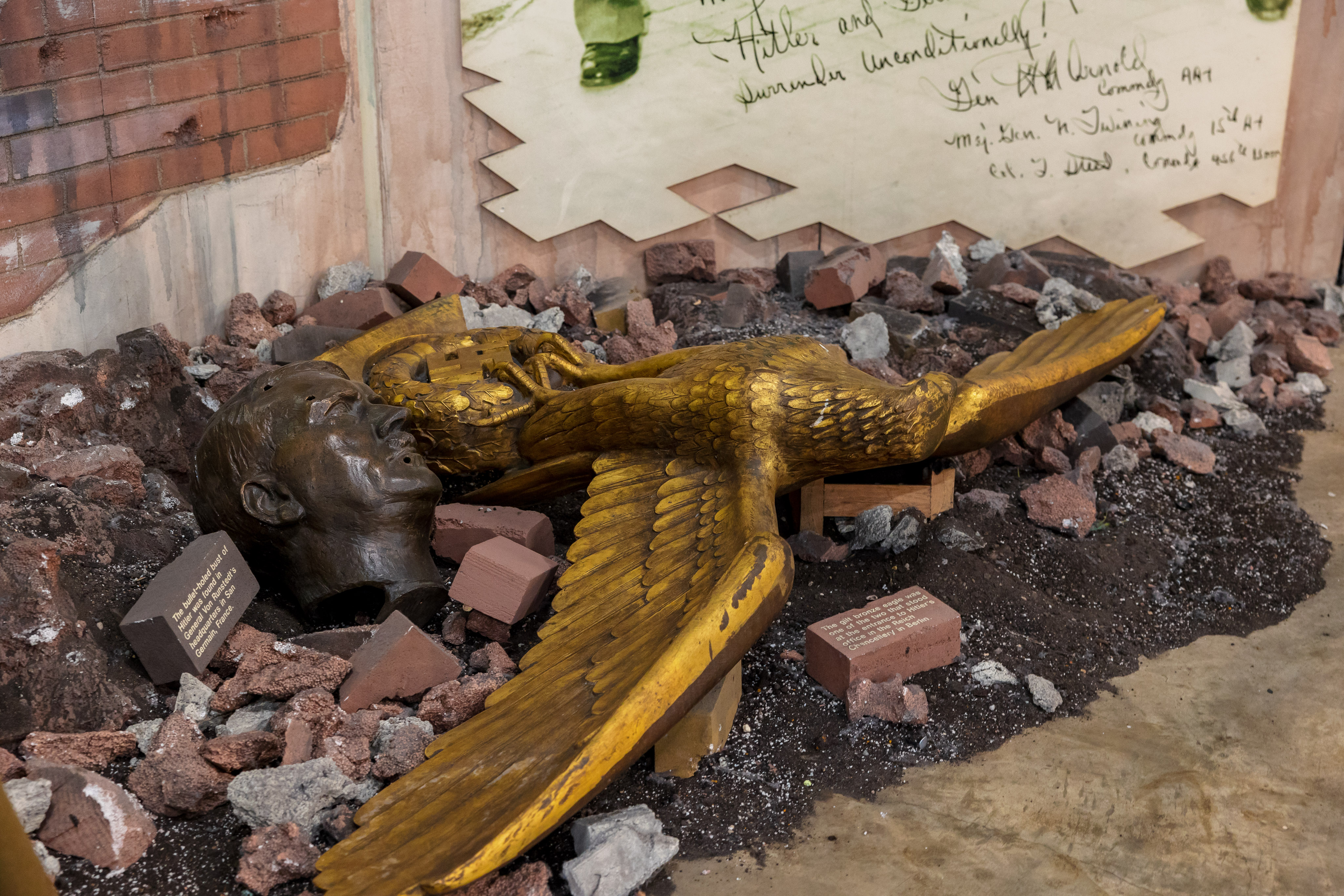
Another Eagle-and-swastika on display at National Museum of the United States Air Force in Ohio

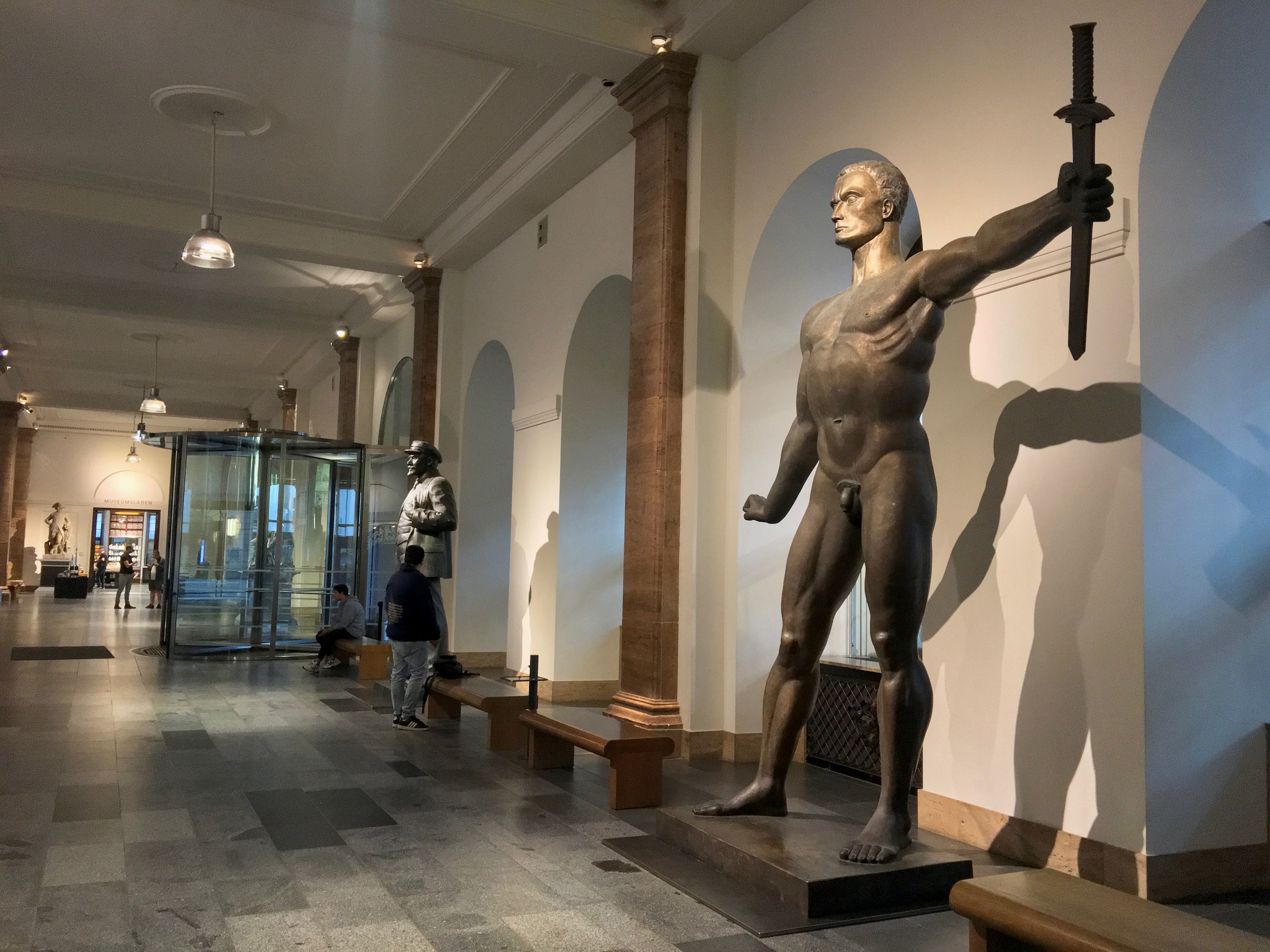
Replica of Arno Breker's Die Wehrmacht (Schwertträger) on display in German Historical Museum in Berlin

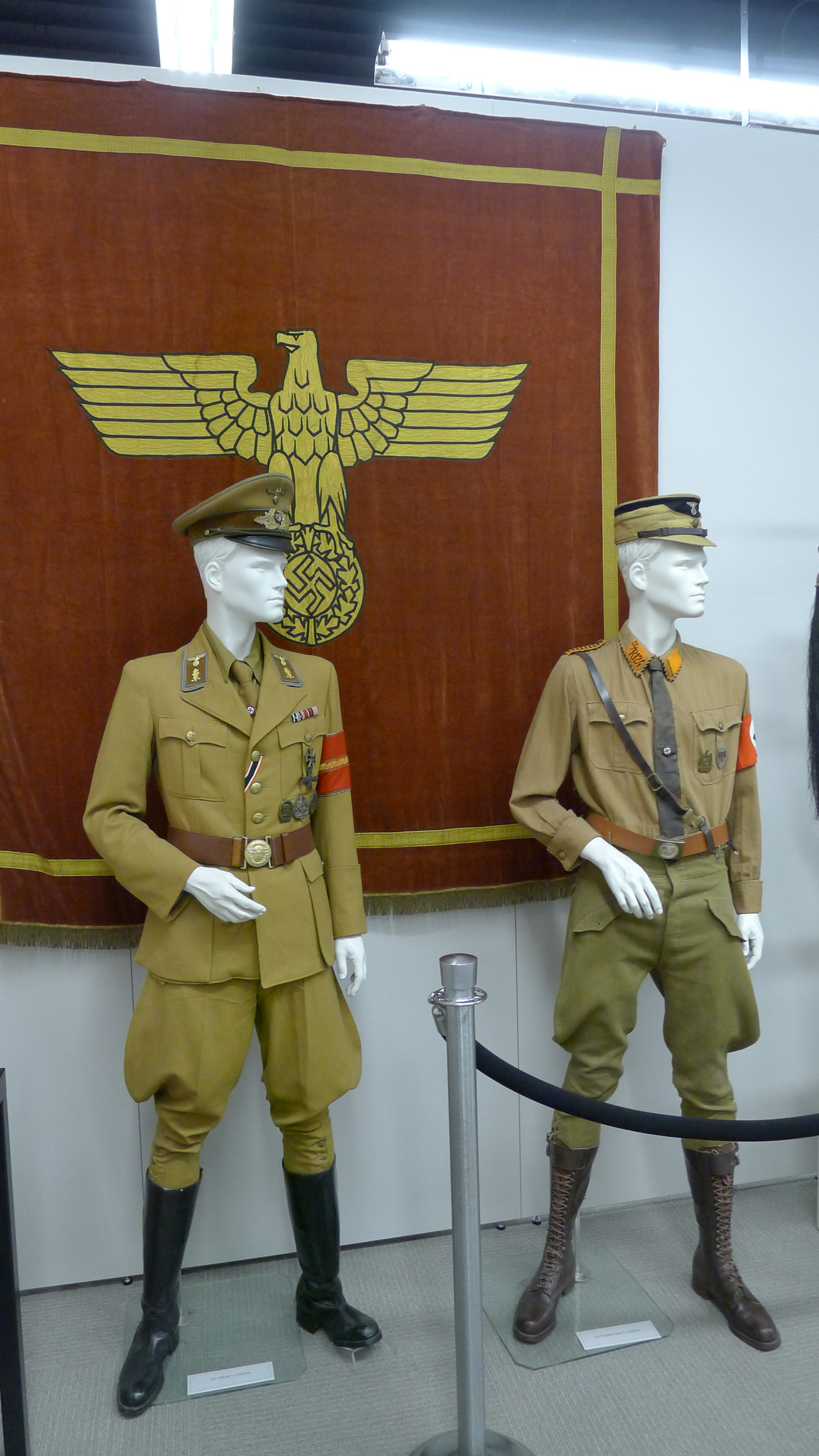
Tapestry from the Reich Chancellery at the former International Museum of World War II, together with uniforms for a party leader and Sturmabteilung member.

== See also ==
- Chief of the Reich Chancellery
- German Chancellery
- Führerbau
- Nazi architecture
- Vorbunker
- Welthauptstadt Germania
- Berchtesgaden Chancellery Branch office

== References and citations ==
=== General ===
- Speer, Albert (1970). Inside the Third Reich. New York: Macmillan. LCCN 70-119132.
- Kellerhoff, Sven Felix (2006). Berlin unterm Hakenkreuz (Berlin under the Swastika). Berlin: Berlin Edition be.bra Verlag GmbH. ISBN 978-3-8148-0147-6.
- Allied Intelligence Map of Key Buildings in Berlin (Third Edition, 1945)

== Documentary ==
- Ruins of the Reich DVD R.J. Adams (Third Reich architecture ruins)
