= Führerbau =

Historically significant building in Maxvorstadt, Munich, Germany

Coordinates: 48°08′46″N 11°34′04″E

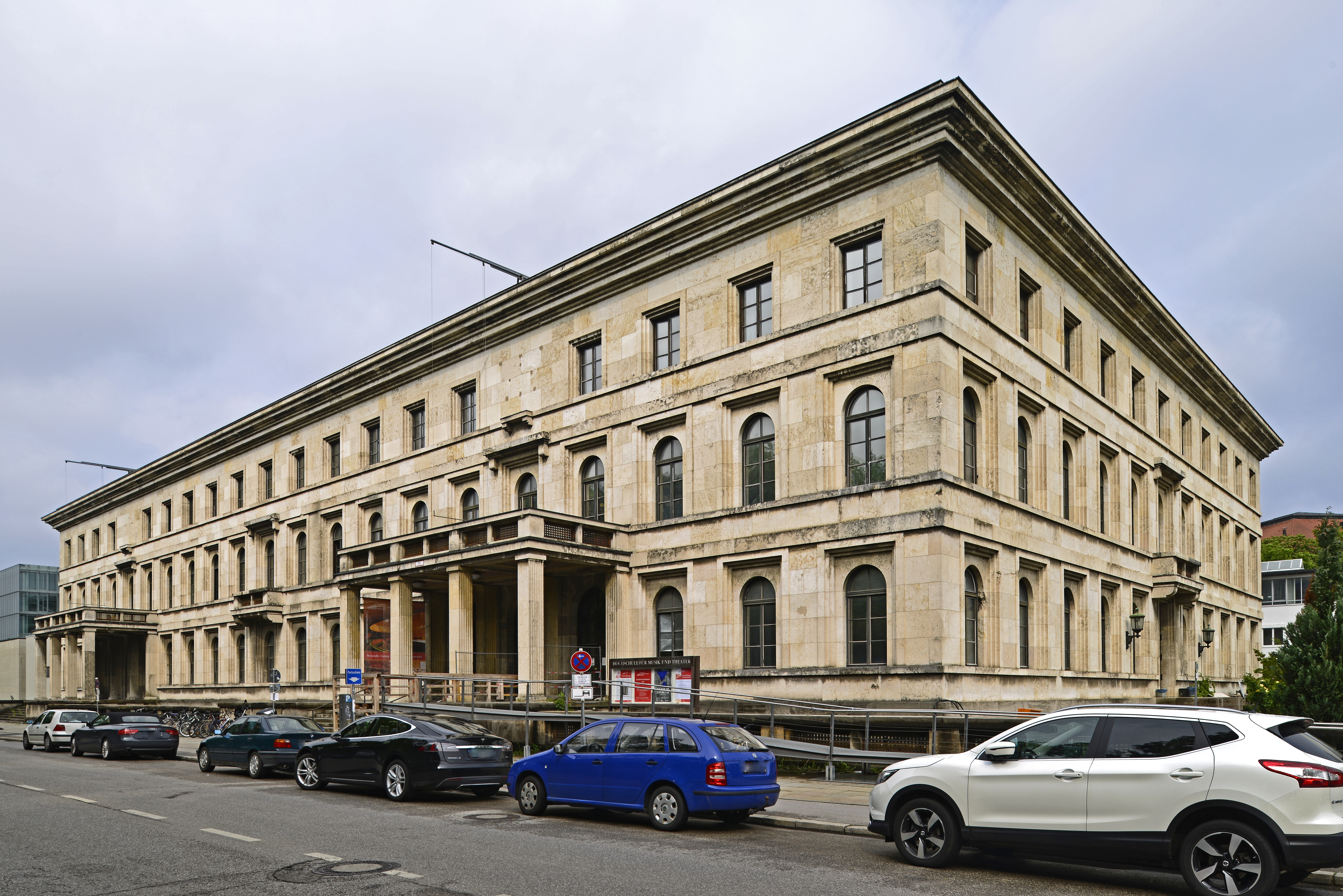
The Führerbau from the outside, 2016

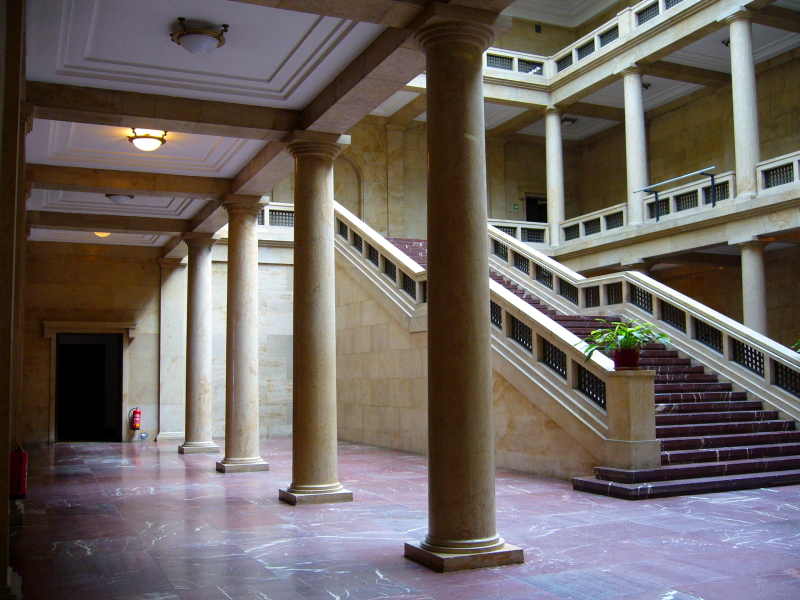
Atrium, 2011

The Führerbau ("the Führer's building") is a historically significant building at Arcisstrasse 12 in Maxvorstadt, Munich. It was built between 1933 and 1937, during the Nazi period, and used extensively by Adolf Hitler. Unlike many other buildings associated with the Nazis, it still stands today and currently houses the University of Music and Performing Arts Munich (German: Hochschule für Musik und Theater München).

== Construction and architecture ==
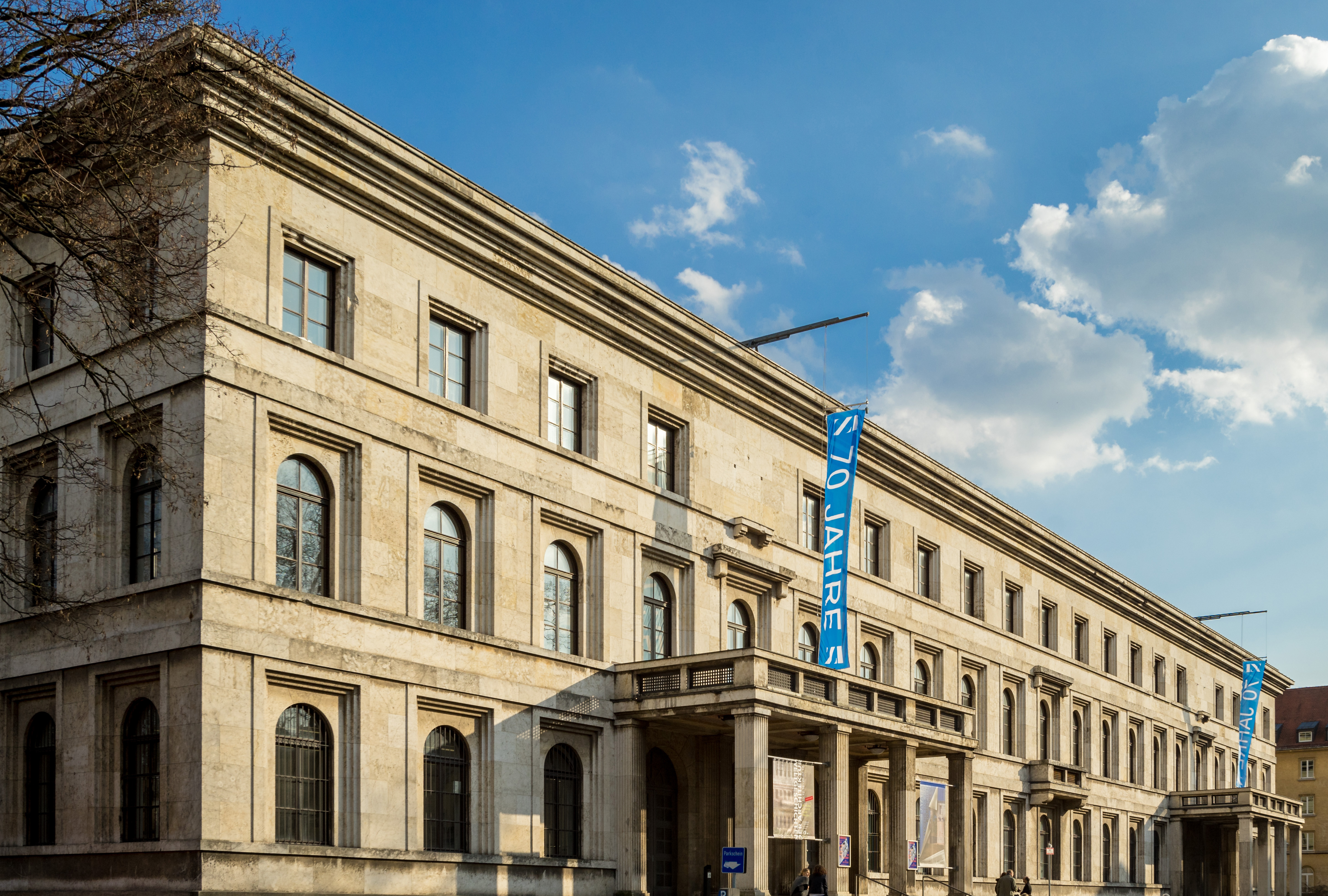
The former Nazi administrative building at 10 Katharina-von-Bora-Strasse, 2017

Plans for the building were first drawn up in 1931, by architect Paul Ludwig Troost, Hitler's then-favorite architect. It was constructed from 1933 to 1937, part of a major remodeling of the Königsplatz, which included two Nazi temples in neo-Classical style that "enshrined" the remains of the 15 Nazis killed in the 1923 Beer Hall Putsch.

After Troost died in 1934, Leonhard Gall continued the building. The Führerbau was constructed north of the Brienner Strasse. A nearly identical building was also constructed south of the Brienner Strasse and opposite the Führerbau. The south building served as the Administrative Building of the NSDAP (German: Verwaltungsbau der NSDAP) at No. 10 Katharina-von-Bora-Strasse. Today it houses the Museum für Abgüsse Klassischer Bildwerke (Museum of Casts of Classical Statues) and Zentralinstitut für Kunstgeschichte (Central Institute for Art History)..

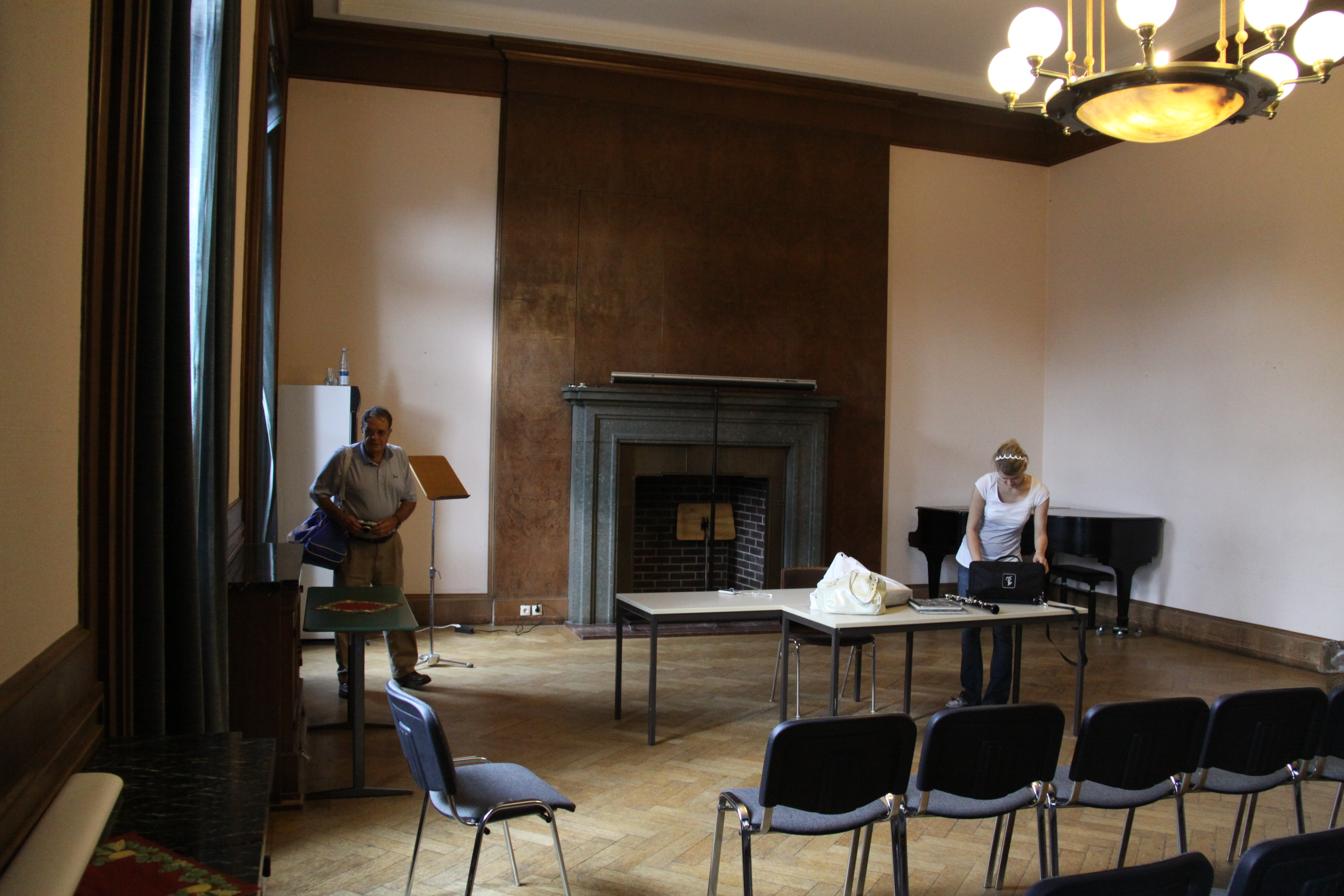
Room that was once Hitler's private study. In 1938, Hitler signed the Munich Agreement here. Note the original fireplace and ceiling lamp, 2009

== History ==
During the Nazi era, the building served as a symbolic building for Adolf Hitler. It is also notable as the site of the signing of the historic 1938 Munich Agreement, under which Czechoslovakia was forced to cede the Sudetenland to Germany. Hitler himself signed the document in his office in the building. Other signatories included representatives of Germany, Italy, France, and the United Kingdom but, notably, not of Czechoslovakia itself. This is today commemorated by the memorial written in German, Czech and Slovak.

Today, the building houses the University of Music and Performing Arts Munich, and its congress hall now serves as a concert venue. From 2005 to 2011, an unknown number of Stolpersteine (between 20 and 25) were installed in the building until city officials removed them for reasons of "fire protection".

After the German surrender, the US occupation forces used the Führerbau and the Nazi administrative building next door as the "Zentrale Sammelstelle" (Central Collecting Point), which stored art from all over Europe which had been looted by the Nazis.
