= Despina Stratigakos =

Canadian architectural historian, writer, and professor

Despina Stratigakos (born 1963) is a Canadian-born architectural historian, writer, former vice provost, and SUNY Distinguished Professor of architecture at the University at Buffalo.

== Education ==
Stratigakos was born in Montreal, Quebec to Greek immigrants, and received her undergraduate education from the University of Toronto and her Master of Arts from the University of California Berkeley. She earned her Ph.D. from Bryn Mawr College. She taught at Harvard University and the University of Michigan before joining the School of Architecture and Planning at the University at Buffalo.

== Academic career ==
From 2018 to 2022, Stratigakos served as the University at Buffalo's Vice Provost of Inclusive Excellence. Stratigakos previously served as a Director of the Society of Architectural Historians, an Advisor of the International Archive of Women in Architecture at Virginia Tech, a Trustee of the Beverly Willis Architecture Foundation, and Deputy Director of the Gender Institute at the University at Buffalo.

She also participated on Buffalo's municipal Diversity in Architecture task force and was a founding member of the Architecture and Design Academy, an initiative of the Buffalo Public Schools to encourage design literacy and academic excellence. In 2016–17, Stratigakos was a member of the Institute for Advanced Study in Princeton.

== Publications ==
Stratigakos's books explore the intersections of power and architecture. Hitler’s Northern Utopia: Building the New Order in Occupied Norway (2020) recounts how architects and planners envisioned and began to build a model “Aryan” society in Norway during World War II. This book won the Society of Architectural Historians 2022 Spiro Kostof Book Award. Where Are the Women Architects? (2016) confronts the challenges women face in the architectural profession. Hitler at Home (2015) investigates the architectural and ideological construction of the Führer's domesticity. A Women’s Berlin: Building the Modern City (2008) traces the history of a forgotten female metropolis. This book won the German Studies Association DAAD Book Prize and the Milka Bliznakov Research Prize.

Stratigakos's publications on the Third Reich have brought previously unknown histories to light, including the influential role of Gerdy Troost. Stratigakos has published on the dangers of erasure of memory and normalization in writing about the Nazis.

Stratigakos is an internationally recognized scholar of diversity and equity in architecture. She has published widely on issues of diversity in architecture. Her 2013 Places Journal article, "Unforgetting Women Architects," on the neglect of women architects in history books and the need to include them in Wikipedia inspired the emergence of Wikipedia edit-a-thons focused on women in design.

Stratigakos has also written about the lack of diversity in representations of architects in Hollywood films as well as among architecture's elite prize winners. In 2007 she curated an exhibition on Architect Barbie at the University of Michigan to focus attention on gendered stereotypes within the architectural profession. In 2011, she collaborated with Mattel on the development and launch of Architect Barbie in the Barbie I Can Be series.

=== Books ===
- Despina Stratigakos and Elana Shapira, Finding Ella Briggs: The Life and Work of an Unconventional Architect (Princeton: Princeton University Press, 2025)
- Despina Stratigakos, Hitler’s Northern Utopia: Building the New Order in Occupied Norway (Princeton: Princeton University Press, 2020)
- Despina Stratigakos,Where Are the Women Architects? (Princeton: Princeton University Press, 2016)
- Despina Stratigakos, Hitler at Home (New Haven: Yale University Press, 2015)
- Despina Stratigakos, A Women’s Berlin: Building the Modern City (Minneapolis: University of Minnesota Press, 2008)

== Honors and awards ==
- Spiro Kostof Book Prize. 2022
- Member, Institute of Advanced Study, Princeton
- Marie Curie Fellowship
- Rice University, Humanities Research Center Visiting Scholar
- Walter B. Sanders Fellow, Taubman College of Architecture and Urban Planning, University of Michigan
- German Studies Association DAAD Book Prize, 2009
