= Leonhard Gall =

German architect

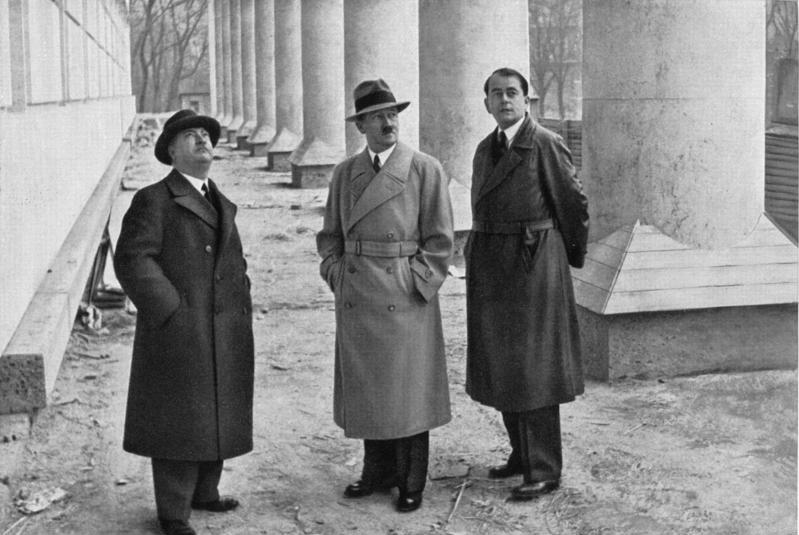
Leonhard Gall, Adolf Hitler, Albert Speer

Professor Leonhard Gall (24 August 1884 in Munich – 20 January 1952) was one of Adolf Hitler's architects.

Gall worked for Paul Troost and he designed a new chancellery for Munich. He was assistant to Troost on the Third Reich's first major architectural project, the House of German Art. After Troost's death in 1934, Gall took charge of the project alongside Troost's widow Gerty. He was named on the Gottbegnadeten list of artists valuable to the Nazi regime in 1944.

== See also ==
- Nazi architecture
