= Paul Troost =

German architect

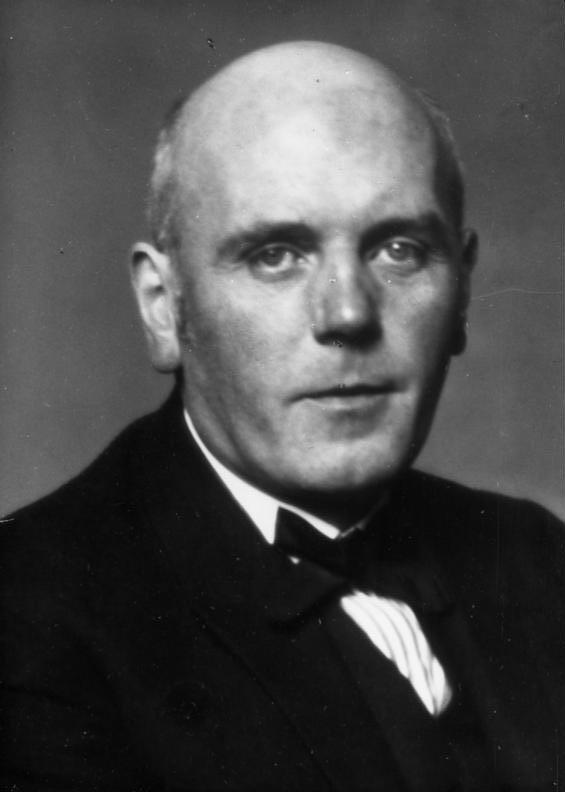
- Born: August 17, 1878
- Died: January 21, 1934 (aged 55)
- Education: Technische Universität Darmstadt
- Occupation: Architect
- Spouse: Gerdy Andresen (m. 1925)

Paul Ludwig Troost (17 August 1878 – 21 January 1934) was a German architect. A favourite master builder of Adolf Hitler from 1930, his Neoclassical designs for the Führerbau, the Verwaltungsbau der NSDAP and the Haus der Kunst in Munich influenced the style of Nazi architecture.

== Life ==
=== Early career ===
Born in Elberfeld in the Rhineland, Troost attended the Technical College of Darmstadt and, upon finishing his course, worked with Martin Dülfer in Munich beginning in 1920. He then qualified as a university lecturer. In the 1920s, he opened his own architectural office and became a member of the modernist Deutscher Werkbund association. Troost designed several rooms of Cecilienhof Palace in Potsdam. After a trip to the United States in 1922, he designed steamship décor for the Norddeutscher Lloyd shipping company, and the fittings for transatlantic liners in a style that combined Spartan traditionalism with elements of modernity. He was in charge of design for all of the company's largest ships, such as SS Europa, SS Berlin, SS München, and SS Homeric, until 1929.

An extremely tall, spare-looking, reserved Westphalian with a close-shaven head, Troost belonged to a school of architects like Peter Behrens and Walter Gropius who, even before 1914, reacted sharply against the highly ornamental Jugendstil movement and advocated a restrained, lean architectural approach, almost devoid of ornament.

=== Hitler ===
Troost and Hitler first met in 1929, through the Nazi publisher Hugo Bruckmann and his wife Elsa. Although before 1933 he did not belong to the leading group of German architects, Troost became Hitler's foremost architect whose neo-classical style became for a time the official architecture of the Third Reich. His work filled Hitler with enthusiasm, and he planned and built state and municipal edifices throughout Germany.

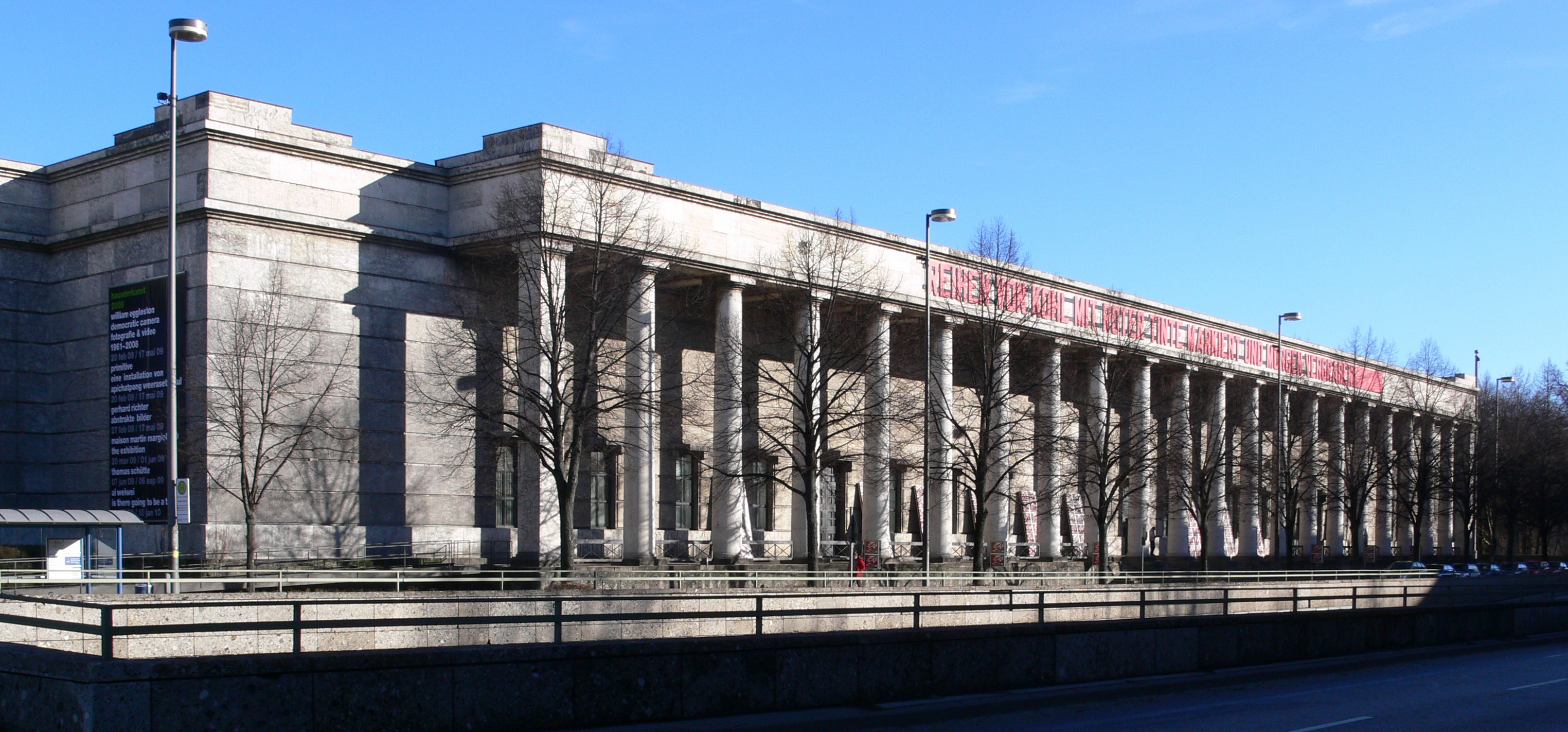
Haus der Kunst in 2009

Hitler commissioned Troost to convert the Barlow Palais in Munich into the headquarters of the Nazi Party, the "Brown House", decorating it in a heavy, anti-modernist style under Hitler's supervision.

In the autumn of 1933, he was commissioned to rebuild and refurnish Hitler's dwellings in the Reich Chancellery in Berlin. Along with other architects like Ludwig Ruff, Troost planned and built State and municipal edifices throughout the country, including new administrative offices, social buildings for workers and bridges across the main highways. One of the many structures he planned before his death was the Haus der Deutschen Kunst ("House of German Art") in Munich, modeled on Schinkel's Altes Museum in Berlin. The museum was constructed from 1933 to 1937 following Troost's plans, and was Nazi Germany's first monumental structure of Nazi architecture. Hitler intended it to be a great temple for a "true, eternal art of the German people". It was a good example of the imitation of classical forms in monumental public buildings during the Third Reich, though subsequently Hitler moved away from the more restrained style of Troost, reverting to the more elaborate imperial grandeur that he had admired in the 19th century Vienna Ring Road (Ringstraße) boulevard of his youth.

Troost also redesigned Königsplatz in Munich to include new Nazi Party buildings and a "Temple of Honour".

Hitler's relationship to Troost was that of a pupil to an admired teacher. According to Albert Speer, who later became Hitler's favorite architect, the Führer would impatiently greet Troost with the words: "I can't wait, Herr Professor. Is there anything new? Let's see it!" Troost would then lay out his latest plans and sketches. Hitler frequently declared, according to Speer, that "he first learned what architecture was from Troost"'. The architect's death on 21 January 1934, after a severe illness, was a painful blow, but Hitler remained close to his widow Gerdy Troost, whose architectural taste frequently coincided with his own, which made her (in Speer's words) "a kind of arbiter of art in Munich".

== Death ==
Troost died on 21 January 1934 at the age of 55. Hitler posthumously awarded him the German National Prize for Art and Science in 1937. He was buried in the Munich Nordfriedhof (Northern Cemetery). The gravestone still survives.

== See also ==
- Nazi architecture
