= Bruckmann's Illustrated Guides =

European travel guide books

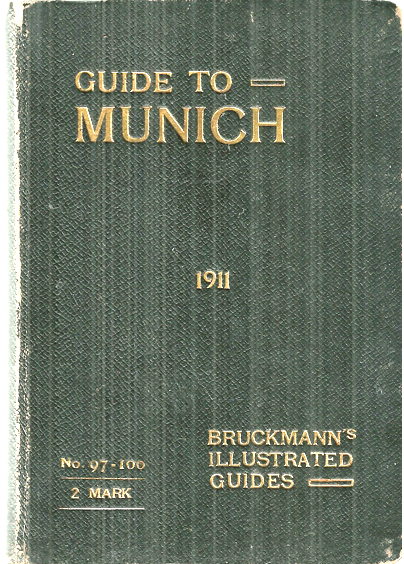
Bruckmann's Guide to Munich, 1911

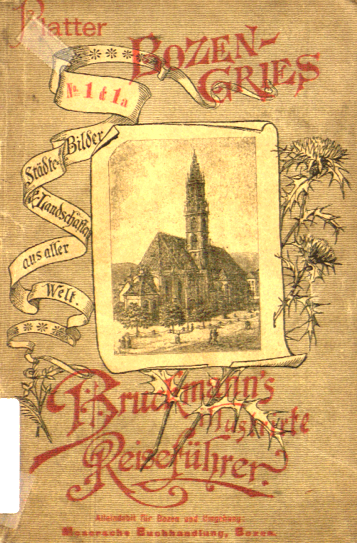
Bruckmann's Bozen-Gries, 1897

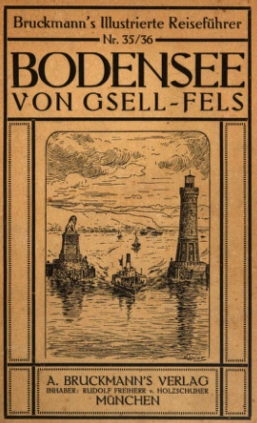
Bruckmann's Bodensee, 1912

Bruckmann's Illustrated Guides (1892-1916) were European travel guide books published by A. Bruckmann in Munich and Asher & Co. in London. The series also appeared in a German-language edition entitled Bruckmann's Illustrierte Reiseführer.
