= Propylaea (Munich) =

City gate in Munich, Germany

Coordinates: 48.1461°N 11.5642°E

The Propylaea (German: Propyläen) is a city gate in Munich at the west side of Königsplatz.

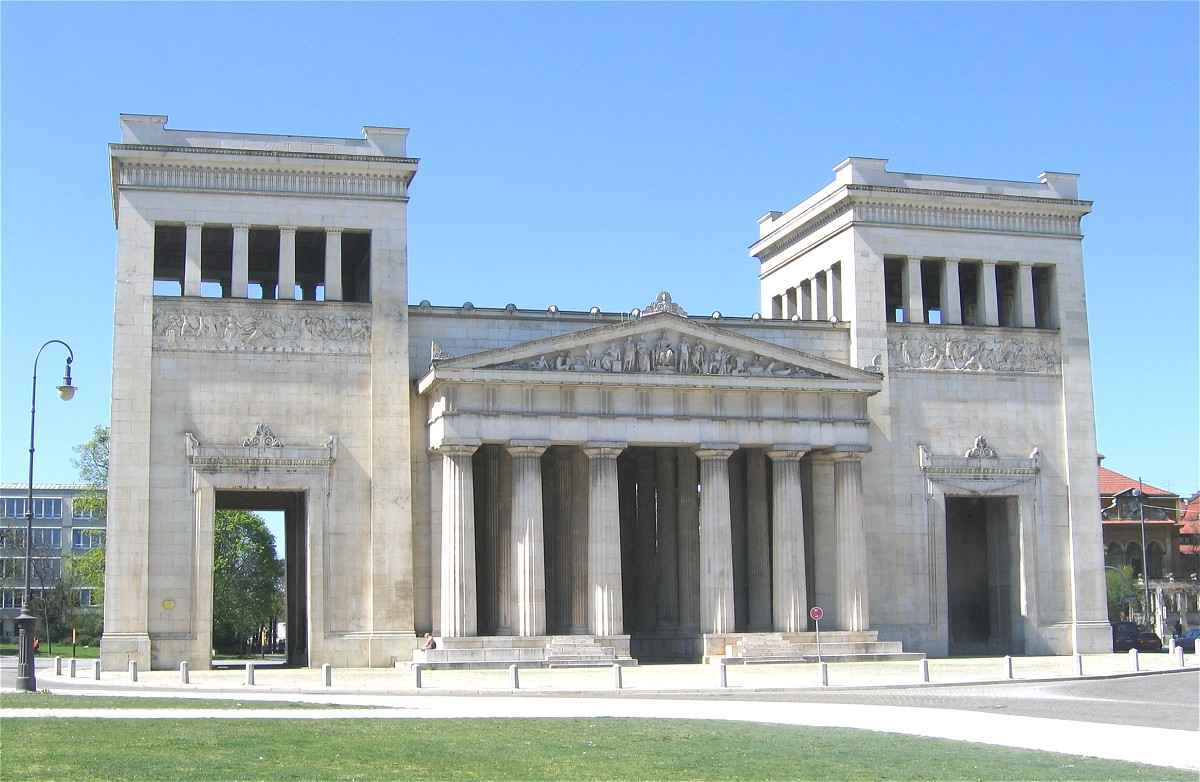
Propylaea in Munich

== History ==
The building, constructed in Doric order, was completed by Leo von Klenze in 1862 and evokes the monumental entrance of the Propylaea for the Athenian Acropolis. The gate was created as a memorial for the accession to the throne of Otto of Greece, a son of King Ludwig I of Bavaria.

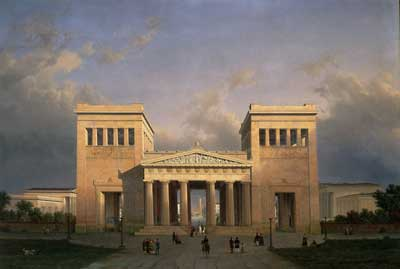
Propylaea at Königsplatz, painting of Leo von Klenze, 1848

As early as 1816, the Propylaea was in the early planning stages, but 30 years passed before the order was issued for its construction. Klenze painted a picture of the planned Propylaea, to promote the project. After King Ludwig I abdicated in 1848, the project was called into question, as, by that time, Munich no longer needed a city gate. Finally, Ludwig I financed the building from his private resources as a symbol of the friendship between Greece and Bavaria, as well as a monument to the Greek War of Independence.

The Propylaea was opened shortly before King Otto was forced to resign as the Bavarian king of Greece. While on a visit to the Peloponnese in 1862, a coup was launched in Greece, a provisional Government was set up and a National Convention summoned . Ambassadors of the Great Powers urged King Otto not to resist, and the king and queen took refuge on a British warship and returned to Bavaria. It can be said that the Propylaea is also a monument to the failed secundogeniture of the Wittelsbach.

== Architecture ==
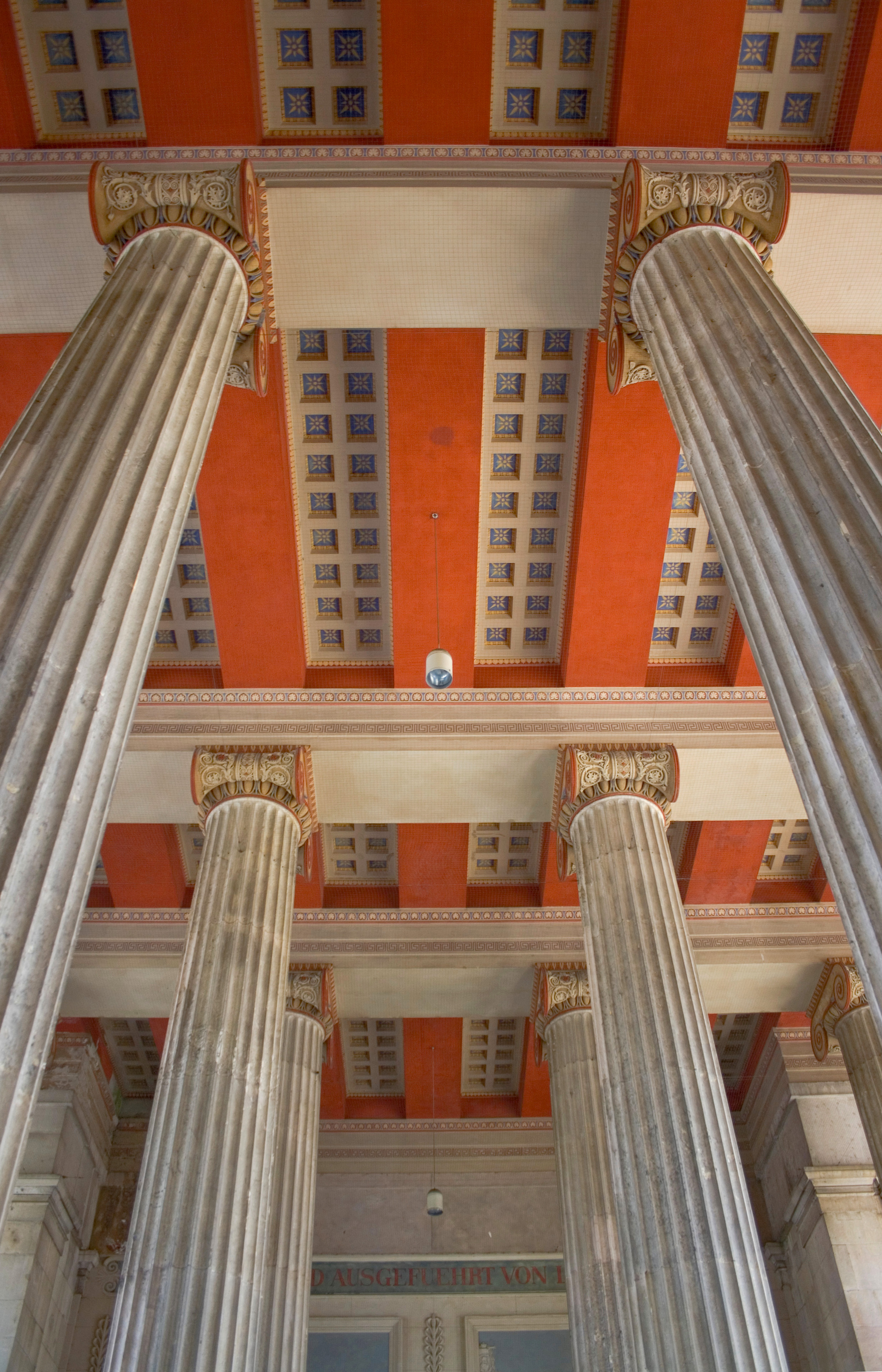
Propylaea at Königsplatz, interior

Each of the two towers of the gate is a powerful block with a large portal and an open room upstairs. The two portals of the towers were used for freight transport. The monumental gate in the middle of the Propylaea was reserved for riders and city cars. The ceilings of the towers were coffered.

While the exterior shows Doric columns, inside the structure, Ionic columns support the Propylaea. The floor plan shows that the basement of the building could be traversed by stairs, platforms and passageways.

The reliefs and sculptures celebrating the Bavarian prince and the Greek War of Independence were created by Ludwig Michael Schwanthaler.

== See also ==
- Propylaea
- Nordertor
- Porta Nigra
- Fortified gateway
