= Königsplatz, Munich =

Square in Munich, Germany

Coordinates: 48°8′44″N 11°33′55″E

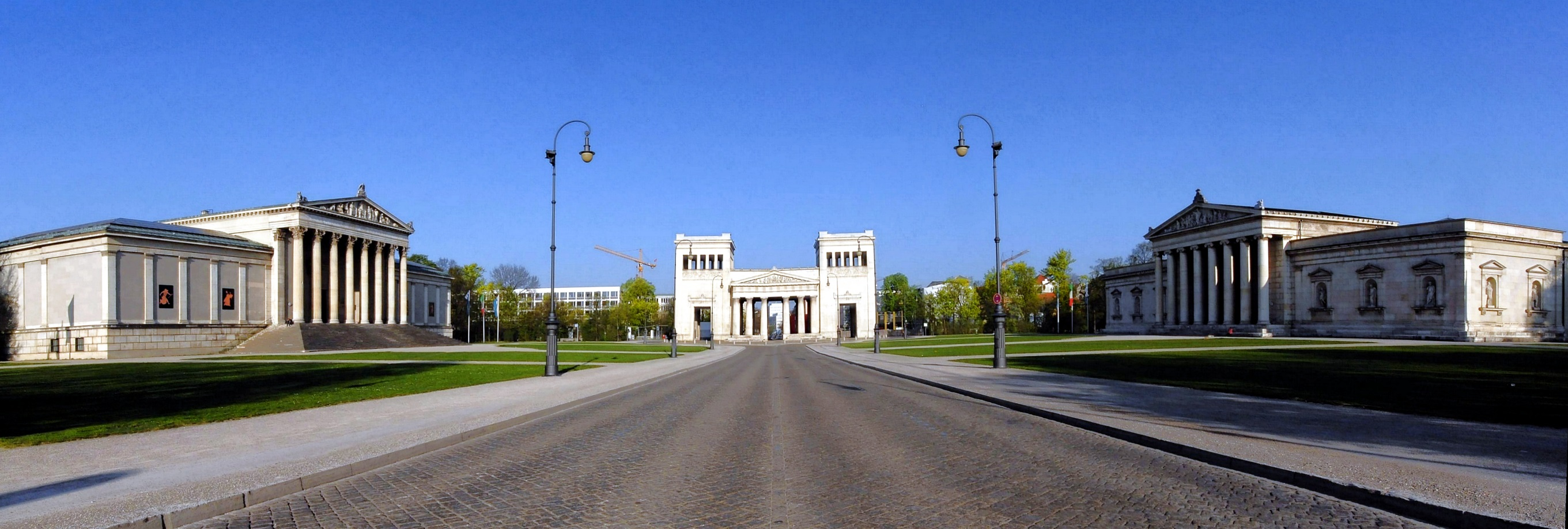
Staatliche Antikensammlungen (left), Propyläen gate (middle) and the Glyptothek (right) at the Königsplatz

Königsplatz, Munich

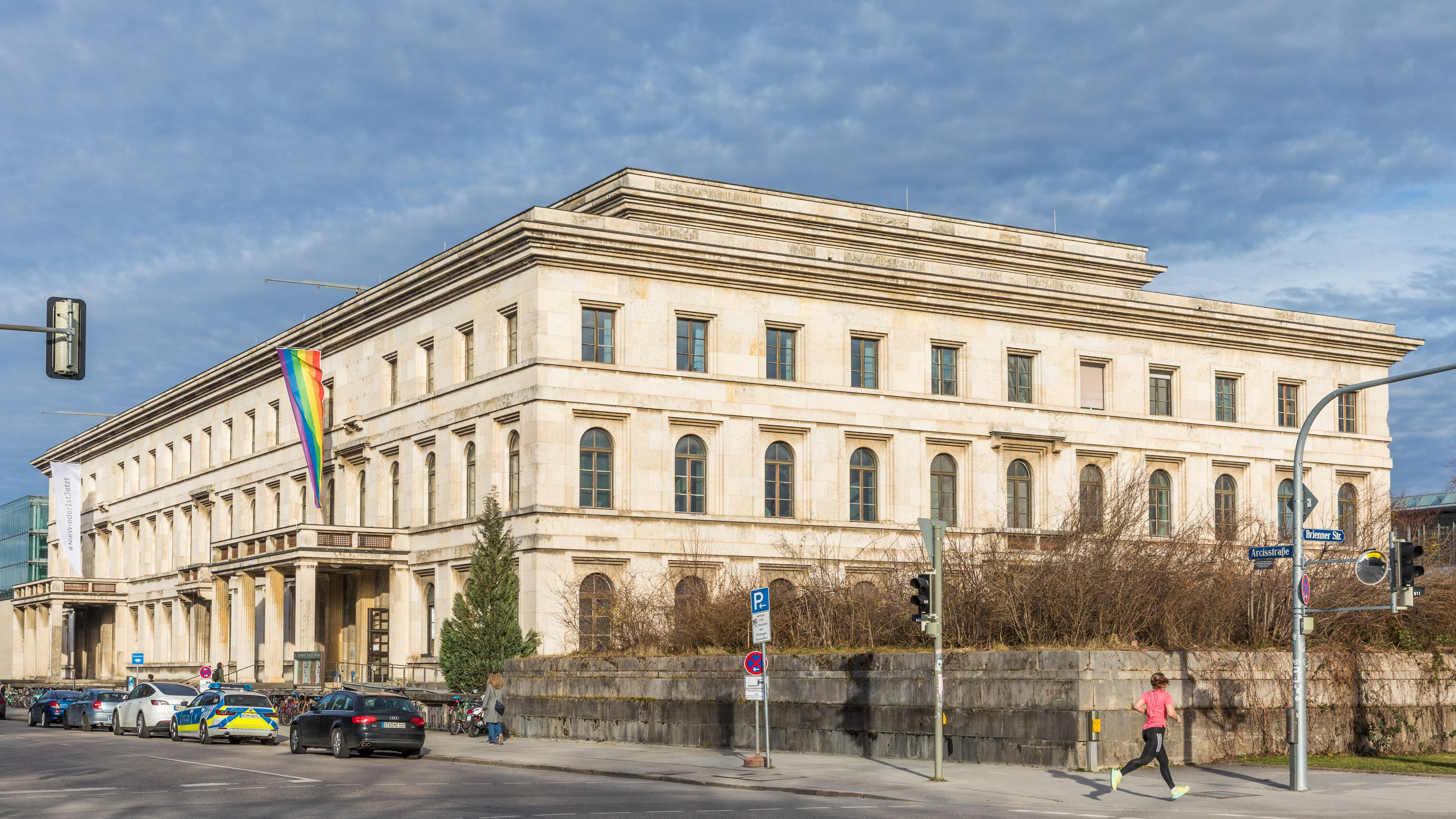
The Führerbau

Königsplatz (German: [ˈkøːnɪçsˌplats], King's Square) is a square in Munich, Germany. Built in the style of European Neoclassicism in the 19th century, it displays the Propyläen Gate and, facing each other, the Glyptothek (archeological museum) and the Staatliche Antikensammlungen (art museum). The area around Königsplatz is home to the Kunstareal, Munich's gallery and museum quarter.

== Architecture ==
The square was designed as part of the representative grouping along the Brienner Straße by Karl von Fischer, Friedrich Ludwig von Sckell, and Leo von Klenze. The square was intentionally set lower at the centre by nearly one meter to make the three monumental buildings dedicated to the ancient past appear higher. The Glyptothek and Propylaea were also designed by Klenze, while the Staatliche Antikensammlungen were designed by Georg Friedrich Ziebland. The museums were built between 1816 and 1845.

The Lenbachhaus is situated at the north-west side of the square.

== Königsplatz during the Third Reich ==
As a beautiful and monumental place, the Königplatz was used during the Third Reich as a square for the Nazi Party's mass rallies. The Brown House, the national headquarters of the Nazi Party in Germany was located at 45 Brienner Straße close to the square.

Two Honor Temples (Ehrentempel) were erected at the east side of the Königsplatz in severe neo-Greek style to echo the architecture of the older buildings; they "enshrined" the remains of the 15 Nazis killed in the 1923 Beer Hall Putsch, who were honored by Nazis as martyrs. Both temples were demolished by the US Army in 1947, although their platforms remain to this day. Two buildings of the Nazi party constructed by Paul Troost next to the temples still exist; in the one north of Brienner Strasse, the Führerbau, where the Munich Agreement was signed in 1938. The other one south of said Boulevard was formerly an administrative building for the Nazi Party. After the war, both buildings were used by the Americans as a "Central Collecting Point", where recovered paintings and other artworks taken for the Nazis' unrealized Führermuseum were stored. Today the north building houses a school for music and theatre called the Hochschule für Musik und Theater München. The south building houses the Museum of Casts of Classical Statues and Zentralinstitut für Kunstgeschichte (Central Institute for Art History).

Nazi book burnings occurred at Königsplatz in 1933.

The March to the Führer (Der Marsch zum Führer) is a Nazi propaganda film released in 1940. It depicts the nationwide march of Hitler Youth to Nuremberg and features the Königsplatz.

After the war the Königsplatz was restored to its pre-war appearance.

== Transportation ==
The Königsplatz is served by a U-Bahn station of the same name.

== Sport ==
During the 2022 European Championships the 2022 European climbing championships and the 2022 European Beach Volleyball Championships events were held at Königsplatz

== See also ==
- Nazi architecture
