= Museum für Abgüsse Klassischer Bildwerke =

Archaeological Museum in Munich

Coordinates: 48°08′40″N 11°34′00″E

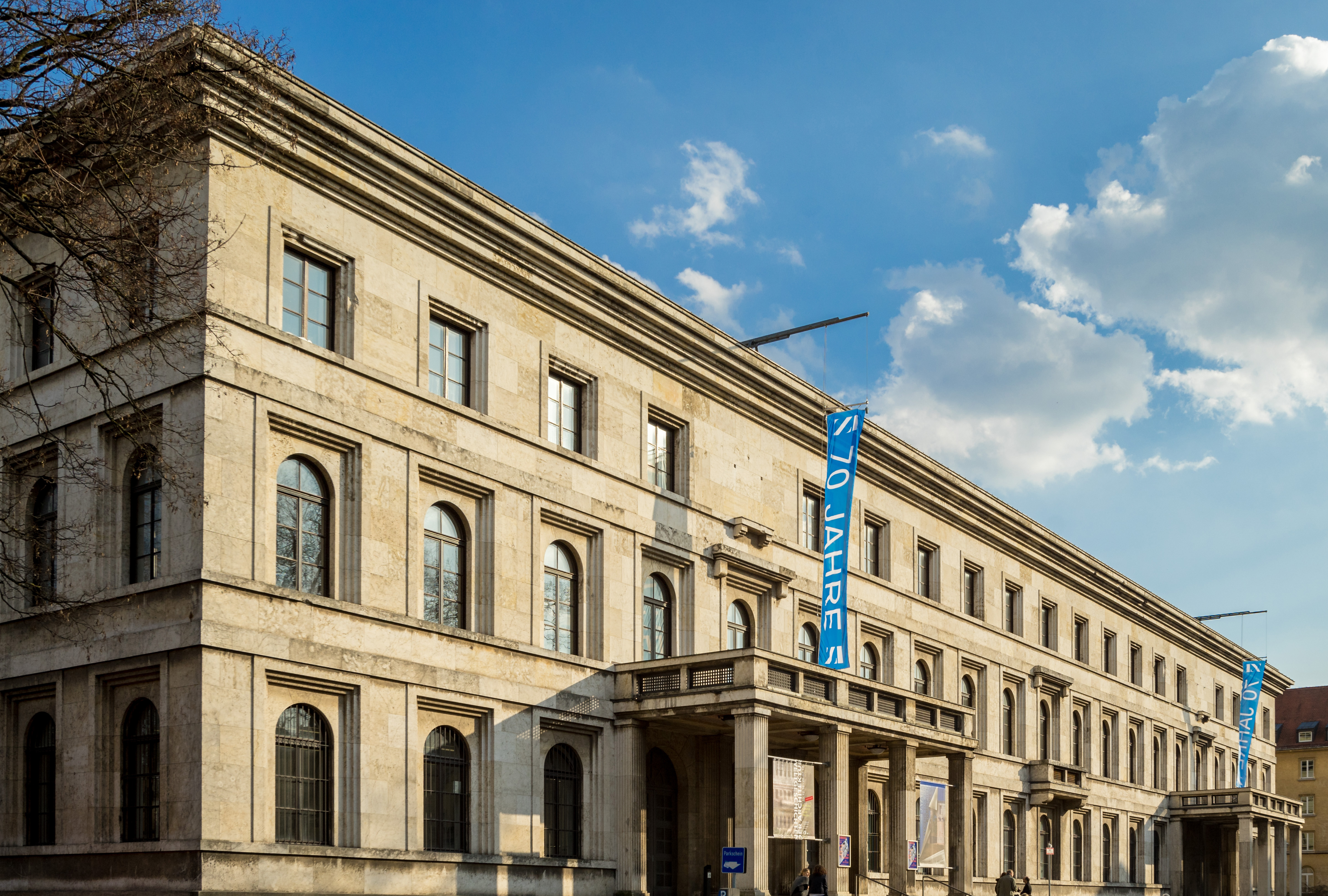
The Munich Haus der Kulturinstitute which contains the Museum für Abgüsse Klassischer Bildwerke

The Museum für Abgüsse Klassischer Bildwerke ("Museum of Casts of Classical Statues") is located in the central Maxvorstadt district in Munich, Bavaria, Germany. It is situated, with a number of other cultural institutions, within the Münchner Haus der Kulturinstitute in Katharina-von-Bora-Straße, near the Königsplatz.
