= Haus der Kunst =

Art museum in Munich, Germany

Coordinates: 48°08′39″N 11°35′09″E

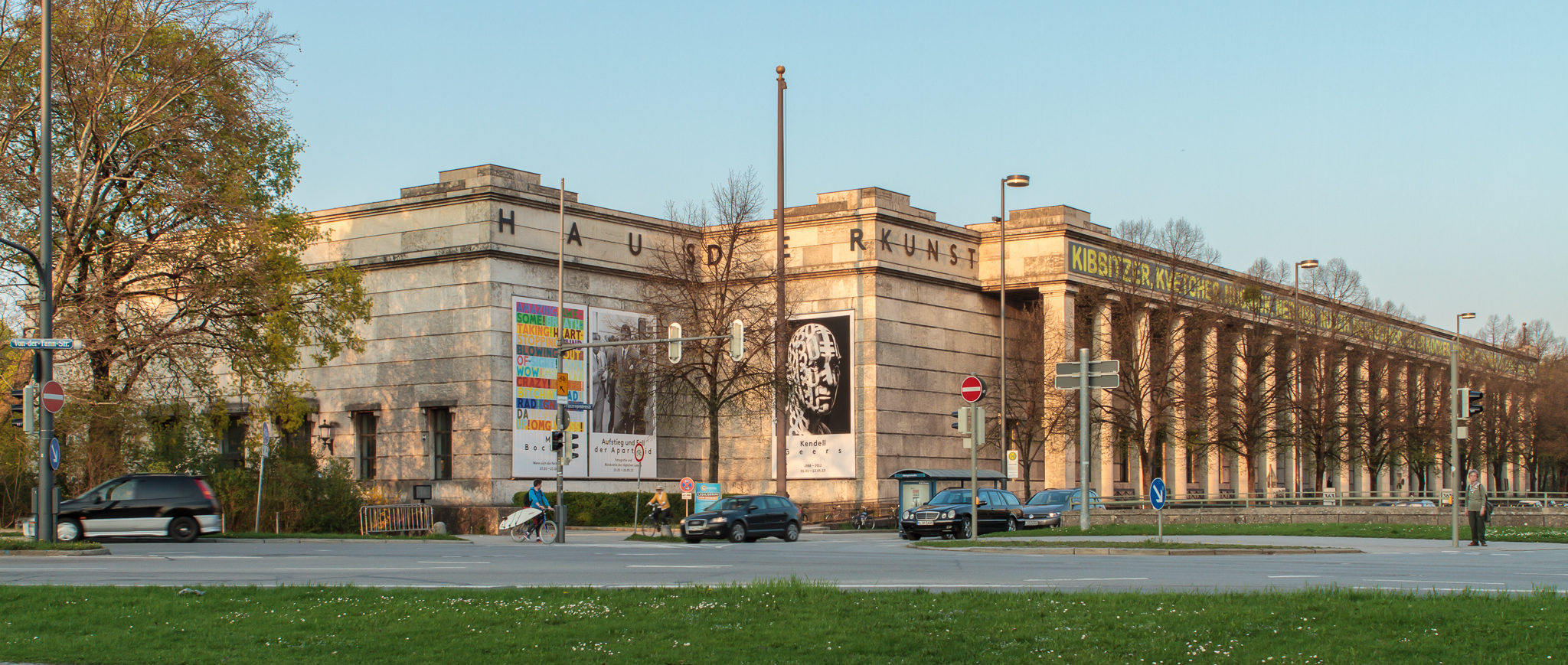
Haus der Kunst

The Haus der Kunst (German: [ˈhaʊs deːɐ̯ ˈkʊnst], House of Art) is a museum for modern and contemporary art in Munich, Bavaria. It is located at Prinzregentenstraße 1 at the southern edge of the Englischer Garten, Munich's largest park. It was built between 1933 and 1937 at the behest of Adolf Hitler and to a monumental neo-classical design by Paul Troost as Haus der deutschen Kunst.

== Exhibits ==
=== Nazi architecture ===
Haus der Kunst was the first major architectural project commissioned by the Nazis. The founding stone was laid by Adolf Hitler in October 1933. Haus der Kunst is an example of totalitarian classicism and was built in stone.

=== Nazi propaganda ===
For the Haus der Kunst opening the Day of German Art was staged on 18 July 1937. On the day, a parade with 6,000 participants and floats depicted the values, aesthetics, and grand aspirations of Nazi art. However, the carefully selected Nazi art did not attract the expected number of visitors. The Nazi elite had to purchase a large number of Nazi artwork to give the opening the veneer of success.

=== Post-war ===
After the end of World War II, the museum building was first used by the US Army occupation forces as an officers' mess. The building's original purpose could still be seen in such guises as the swastika-motif mosaics in the ceiling panels of its front portico.

Beginning in 1946, the museum rooms, now partitioned into several smaller exhibition areas, started to be used as temporary exhibition space for trade shows and visiting art exhibitions. Some parts of the museum were also used to showcase works from those of Munich's art galleries that had been destroyed during the war. The original steps at the building's entrance were removed to make way for a road tunnel, which opened in 1972.

=== Since 2000 ===
In 2002, the National Collection of Modern and Contemporary Arts moved into the Pinakothek der Moderne. Today, while housing no permanent art exhibition of its own, the Haus der Kunst is still used as a showcase venue for temporary exhibitions and traveling exhibitions, including on Tutankhamun, Zeit der Staufer, Gilbert and George (2007), Andreas Gursky (2007), Anish Kapoor (2007), Ai Weiwei (2009), Ellsworth Kelly (2011), Georg Baselitz (2014), Louise Bourgeois (2015), and Frank Bowling (2017). A 2012 joint venture with the Museum of Contemporary Art, Los Angeles, Ends of the Earth: Land Art to 1974 was the first major museum survey of land art worldwide. The museum also drew acclaim for Postwar: Art Between the Pacific and the Atlantic, 1945-1965 in 2016, an effort to tell a global narrative of art in the two decades after World War II. A 2019 retrospective of the Ghanaian sculptor El Anatsui became the museum's best-attended show in 10 years.

In 2013, London-based architect David Chipperfield was commissioned to submit plans for refurbishing Haus der Kunst; the plans were eventually presented to the public in 2016. For approximately 60 million euros, the planned renovation aims to create space for cinema, performance and musical events. Chipperfield also proposed to open up blocked skylights to allow daylight into the building.

After artistic director Okwui Enwezor's departure for health reasons in 2018, Haus der Kunst appointed an expert commission to oversee programming and strategy between 2019 and 2020. The commission was led by Bice Curiger and also included Achim Hochdörfer and the Goetz Collection. In 2019, a selection committee selected Andrea Lissoni as new artistic director; the committee was chaired by Nina Zimmer and included Daniel Birnbaum, Doryun Chong, Susanne Gaensheimer, and Nicholas Serota. Andrea Lissoni is the new artistic director of the Haus der Kunst, appointed by the Bavarian State Ministry for Science and Arts.

== Partnerships ==
In 2011, Haus der Kunst forged a partnership with the private Goetz Collection to co-curate exhibits of video art. By 2013, it was one of the beneficiaries, along with the Bavarian State Museums and the Neues Museum Nürnberg in Nuremberg, when Ingvild Goetz donated her collection of video art to the state of Bavaria and made the collection as a whole, which includes almost 5,000 works, available on permanent loan.

== Management ==
=== Directors ===
- 1993–2003: Christoph Vitali
- 2003–2011: Chris Dercon
- 2011–2018: Okwui Enwezor
- From 2020: Andrea Lissoni

=== Funding ===
The State of Bavaria is the biggest shareholder of Haus der Kunst, and provides the museum with millions of euros every year. Since 1983, the museum building also houses the nightclub P1, Munich's famous high-society destination; the rent is one of the museum's revenue streams.

In 2011, Dercon left Haus der Kunst with capital of €1.5 million. During his time in office, Enwezor oversaw the initial fundraising for the planned €150 million renovation of Haus der Kunst. In 2018, however, Haus der Kunst cancelled an exhibition of video and performance artist Joan Jonas, citing "a difficult financial situation stemming from management errors of the past." It also had to postpone a Theaster Gates show until 2019.

== 2017 controversy ==
In March 2017, a controversy received international media attention when the director of the Haus der Kunst, Okwui Enwezor, fired a member of the Church of Scientology based on the man's religious affiliation. In Bavaria, civil servants and employees of publicly funded institutions are required to sign that they are not Scientologists.
