= Old Drunkard =

Ancient Greek statue

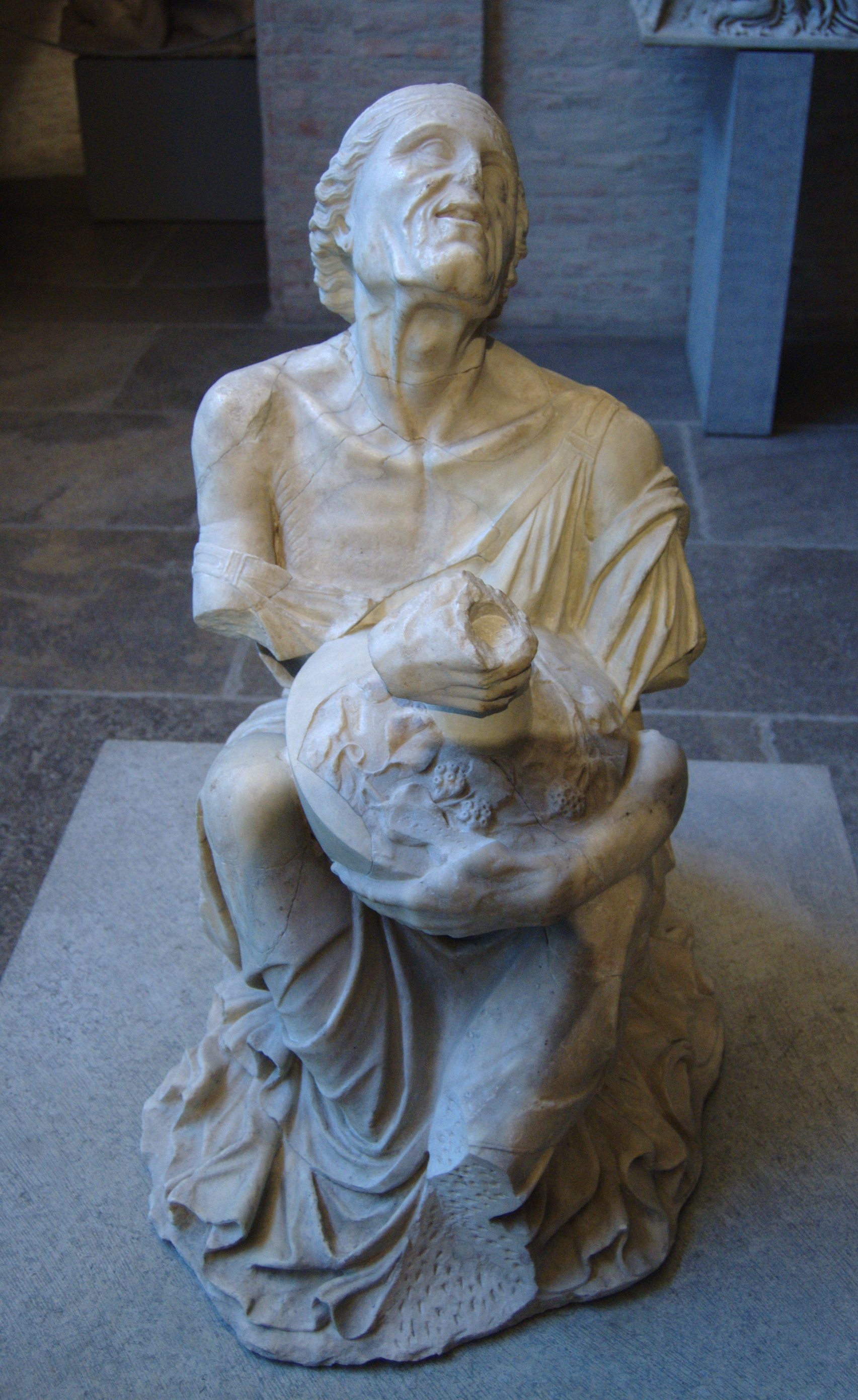
The Old Drunkard; Glyptothek, München

The Old Drunkard is a female seated statue from the Hellenistic period, which survives in two Roman marble copies. The original was probably also made of marble. This genre sculpture is notable for its stark realism.

The Greek original sculpture is long lost, but two Roman copies survive, one in the Capitoline Museum in Rome and the other in the Glyptothek in Munich. Scholarship considers the Old Drunkard to be a votive offering to the god Dionysus, whose attributes include both the wine jar and also the ivy.

== Original sculpture and copies ==
The statue of the Old Drunkard was created in the Hellenistic period, but the exact time of its creation cannot be determined. In scholarship the Old Drunkard is generally dated to the late third century BC on the basis of stylistic parallels. The bulky, blocky composition and the pyramidal structure is comparable to the Scythians of the Marsyas Flayer Group, which is dated to the first half of the second century BC and to the figure of the Goose strangler, which is dated to the middle or later third century BC.

The copy in Munich is dated to the first century AD and is considered the better copy. The Capitoline copy is dated to the second century AD. A third copy in terracotta is stored in the Villa Romana del Casale in Piazza Armerina, Sicily; it was found in the necropolis of Montagna di Marzo in Piazza Armerina and its head has been reconstructed in line with the Capitoline example.

== Location ==
=== Original ===
According to Pliny the original version of the statue was displayed at Smyrna in Asia Minor. In book 36 of his Natural History, he lists 32 significant marble artworks which were not located in Rome, including an anus ebria (Latin for "Drunken crone"). She is said to have been made by Myron of Thebes which he incorrectly equates with the homonymous sculptor Myron who lived in the fifth century BC. Alexandria has been suggested as a second possible location of the original on account of the lagynos which the old woman holds in front of herself. The lagynos was the source of the name of the lagynophoria, the flask-festival, which was founded by Ptolemy IV.

=== Munich copy ===
The statue of the Old Drunkard in the Munich Glyptothek was in the possession of Cardinal Ottoboni in Rome from 1700. At that time it was among the best known antiquities in the city. Domenico de Rossi included it in his Raccolta di statue antiche e moderne (Collection of Ancient & Modern Statues) in 1704, which he published together with Paolo Alessandro Maffei. The Old Drunkard was esteemed at that time mostly on account of her ecstatic expression. In 1714 Ottoboni sent the statue to Düsseldorf as a gift for Elector Johann Wilhelm. After a period in Mannheim it was transferred to the Munich Residenz by Elector Charles Theodore in 1803. Leo von Klenze refused to admit the Old Drunkard into the Glyptothek when it was established by King Ludwig I.

After 1865 the Old Drunkard was transferred to Heinrich Brunn's new replica collection and displayed in the museum's replica gallery. In 1895 the statue was finally put on display in the Munich Glyptothek by Adolf Furtwängler, in the "Roman gallery" rather than with the Greek sculpture. Today the sculpture is counted among the show-pieces of the collection, along with the Barberini Faun and the Boy with the Goose.

== Description ==
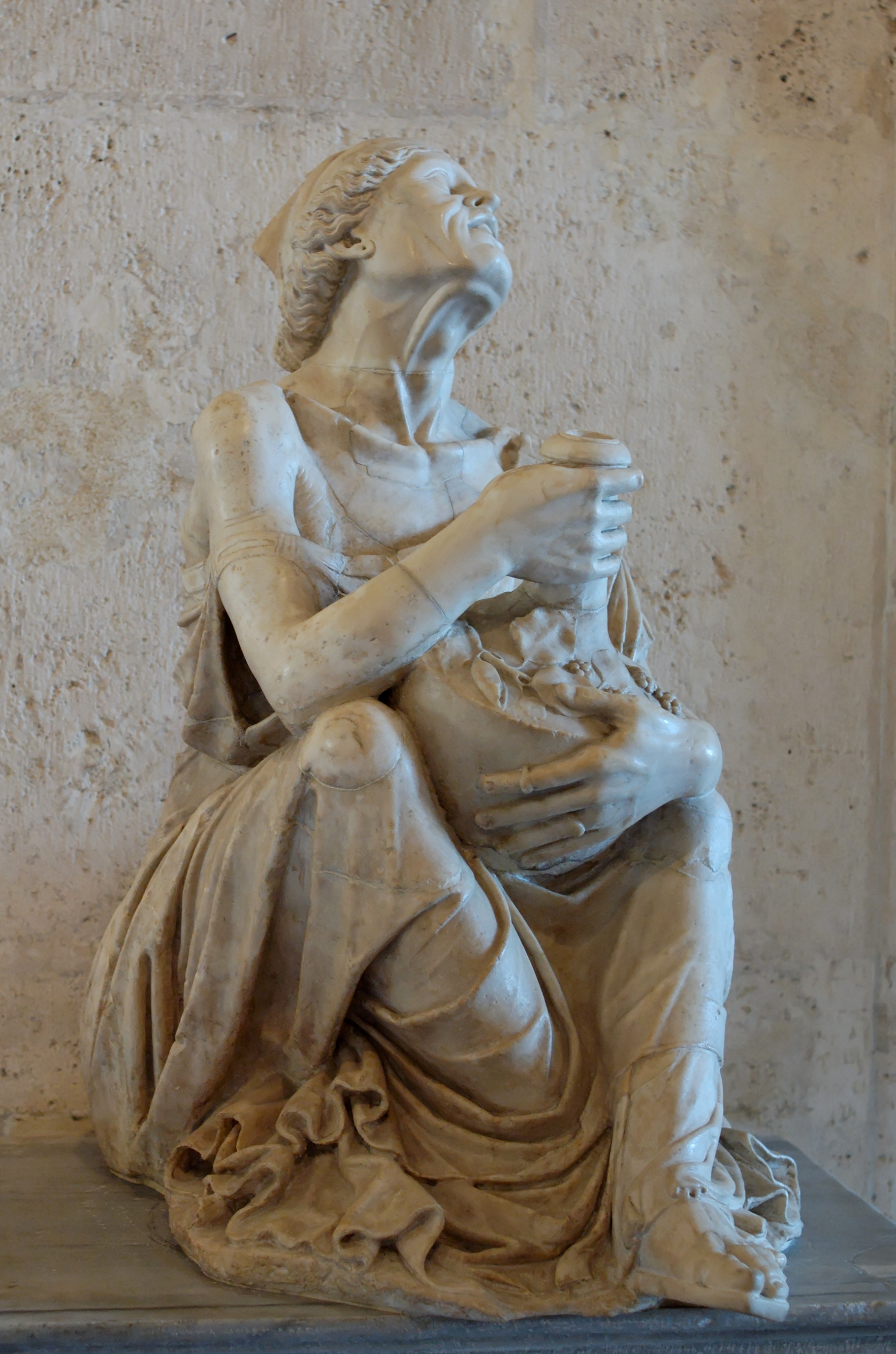
Copy in the Capitoline Museum, Rome

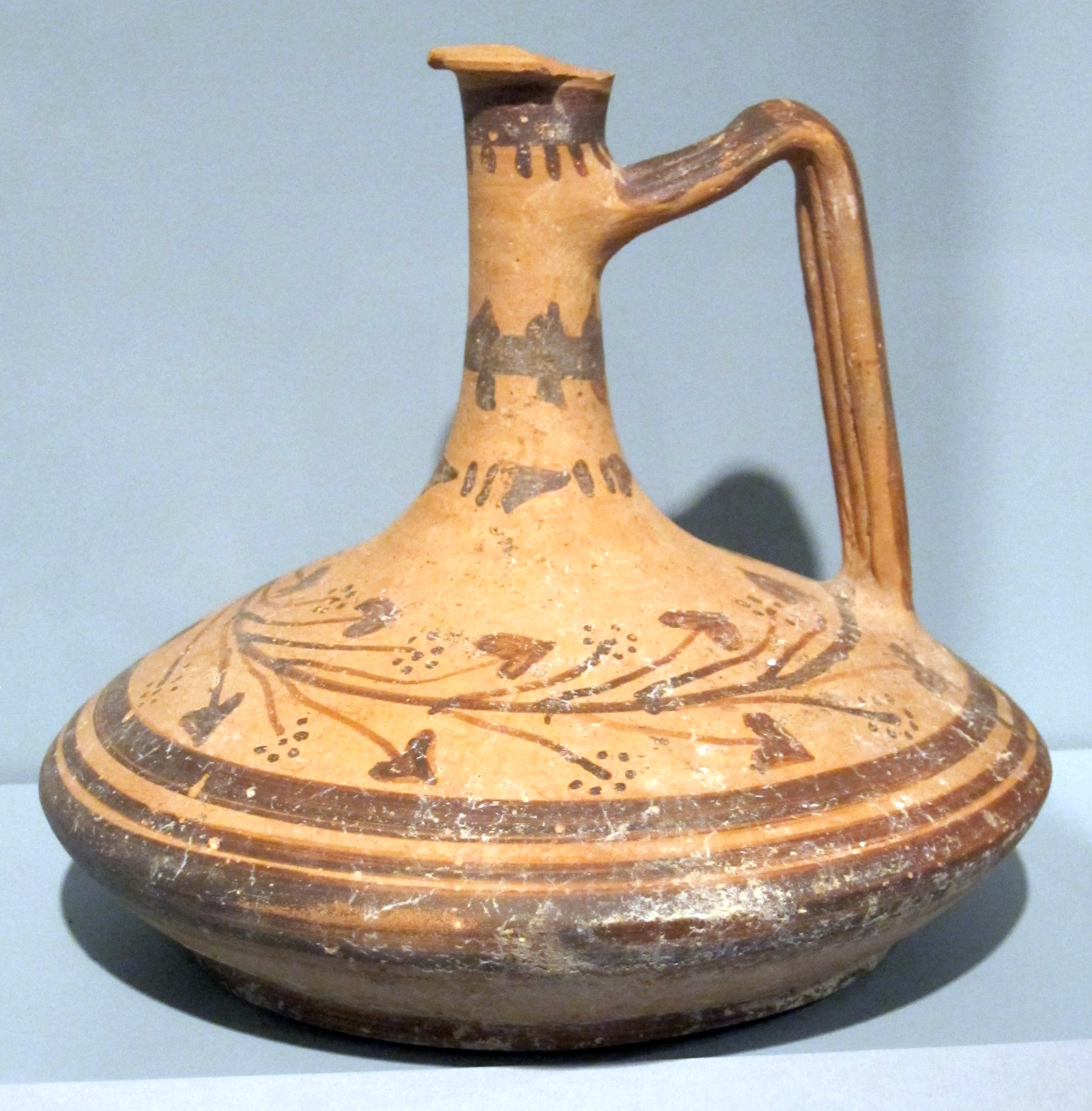
Hellenistisc terracotta lagynos

The sculpture depicts an aged woman, who squats on the ground and holds an open flask in her lap. At a height of around 92 centimetres, the statue is about life size. The woman sits on the ground and extends her legs in front of herself and crosses her ankles such that the left leg sits in front of the right one. She holds the lagynos flask in her lap, grasping it tightly around the neck and belly. The flask which presumably holds unmixed wine, is decorated with an ivy vine pattern.

The woman is dressed in a chiton (garment) which would be secured with metal pins and which is girded round the middle of the body with a belt. The right pin has slipped off her shoulder, leaving her upper body uncovered, without exposing her breast. The motif of the pin which has slipped off the shoulder traditionally had erotic connotations and appears especially in depictions of the goddess of love, Aphrodite. Over the chiton, the woman wore a heavy cloak, which has fallen to the ground and piles up around her. The woman's clothing recalls contemporary fashion. The same clothing is also found in depictions of Aphrodite and Nymphs, and also of distinguished women of the time.

On the exposed upper body, the collar bone and ribs emerge from the Décolletage, as do the shoulder blades and the spinal column at the back. The skin is stretched in a thin sheet over the skeleton and the underlying muscles, veins and tendons are depicted in an anatomically correct way. A thick vein runs up her neck directly under the skin and disappears into a jowl under her chin.

Pierced ears indicate golden earrings, which would have been inserted. A headscarf holds her hair out of her face. The head of the Old Drunkard is raised, her mouth is slightly open and her eyes stare off into space. Her skin is loose and hangs in folds over her cheeks and jaw. The Nasolabial fold is pronounced and crow's feet surround the eyes. The open mouth exposes two remaining teeth. The woman's hair is carefully styled, wrapped at the sides and gathered up with a band above the neck. Her headscarf is carefully wrapped around her head; a few locks peep out under it, as if by accident. She wears two rings on her left hand, one on her pointing finger and one on her ringfinger, which implies that she was wealthy and had some social status.

== Interpretation ==
Paolo Alessandro Maffei thought the wine flask in the woman's lap was a lamp and interpreted the upraised head and the slightly open mouth as indicating that she was praying to the gods. He considered the Old Drunkard to be a priestess of Dionysos. Heinrich Bulle argued in a catalogue of the display pieces of the Munich Glyptothek that the Old Drunkard was conceived as an artistic exercise and was created for the garden of a rich and whimsical worshiper of Dionysos.

In the 1970s interpretations which stressed the socially problematic nature of the figure prevailed. It was asserted that the sculptor had striven to make the misery of the woman notable and that a deep sympathy for this poor, old, rejected woman should be attributed to him. Since then, on the other hand, scholars like Ludger Alscher have seen indifference to suffering and mortality in the extreme stress on the age of the figure.

Paul Zanker is of the opinion that the Old Drunkard depicts the comedic topos of the retired Hetaira. From the fifth century BC, the old drunken woman had been a staple of Greek comedy. In comedy the old woman is always characterised as an ugly, greedy, man-crazy gossip and a drunkard. She appeared on stage mainly in two roles: the former wet nurse and the retired Hetaira or madame. This figure is not a full member of society, but a slave, servant or metic (resident foreigner), making her a safe figure of fun.

Christian Kunze also saw the trope of the drunken old woman, but he did not accept Zanker's identification of her with an elderly hetaira. Instead, he pointed to similar depictions in the minor arts and in contemporary literary sources, which include epigrams composed by poets in which old women are described simply as alcoholics. The depictions in the minor arts include wet-nurses and hetairai, but also fat, talkative drunkards. In the minor arts it is notable that the depictions include all of the elements of the stereotype, not just drunkenness. Kunze is therefore of the opinion that the sculpture of the Old Drunkard was distinct from the depictions in the minor arts and very unusual for the Hellenistic period in focussing solely on the theme of drunkenness. He sees this drunken behaviour being increased to superhuman levels, such that the woman's only desire is her immense thirst for wine. Thus, he considers the sculpture to be a focussed depiction of uninhibited drunkenness. Reduced to just this facet and possessed by the supernatural force of unlimited thirst, he considers the old woman to become the mortal counterpart of the satyrs, the mythic companions of Dionysus. Kunze thus saw the Old Drunkard as equivalent to the dedication of a figure of a satyr in honour of Dionysus. He believed that support for this position was found in depictions of satyrs, which he believed the Old Drunkard owed much to in terms of posture. Thus, in Kunze's opinion, no identification of the Old Drunkard with a specific role is correct - she remains an anonymous figure who pays tribute to the god through her intoxication and enters the word of the Dionysiac cult in this way.

Other researchers have proposed that the Old Drunkard is some kind of priestess, on account of her fancy clothing and especially her headscarf, though recent research has argued that the headscarf is not limited to this context, but is in fact common in depictions of wet nurses, old women in religious contexts, old hetairai, and citizen women. Elizabeth Pollard has argued that the Old Drunkard stereotype is consistent with the contemporary Roman imaginings of how witches might look and how their community would have experienced them.

== Bibliography ==
- Dieter Ohly: Glyptothek München: griechische und römische Skulpturen. Ein Führer. München 1977.
- Paul Zanker: Die Trunkene Alte. Das Lachen der Verhöhnten. Fischer, Frankfurt/Main 1988. ISBN 3-596-23960-5.
- Paolo Moreno: "Vecchia ubriaca." In: Enciclopedia dell' Arte Antica II Supplemento. Rom 1997. Full text
- Christian Kunze: "Verkannte Götterfreunde. Zur Deutung und Funktion hellenistischer Genrefiguren." In: Römische Mitteilungen 106, 1999, pp. 69–80.
- Elizabeth A. Pollard: "Witchcrafting in Roman Literature and Art: New Thoughts on an Old Image" Magic, Ritual, and Witchcraft (2008), 119-155.
- Raimund Wünsche: Glyptothek München. Meisterwerke griechischer und römischer Skulptur. München 2005. p. 114.
- Ursula Mandel: "Räumlichkeit und Bewegungserleben. Körperschicksale im Hochhellenismus (240-190 v. Chr.)," in Peter Cornelis Bol (ed.): Die Geschichte der antiken Bildhauerkunst III. Hellenistische Plastik. Zabern, Mainz 2007, pp. 173–177.
- R. R. R. Smith: Hellenistic Sculpture: A Handbook. 2006, pp. 136–140.
