= Glyptothek =

- Glyptothek
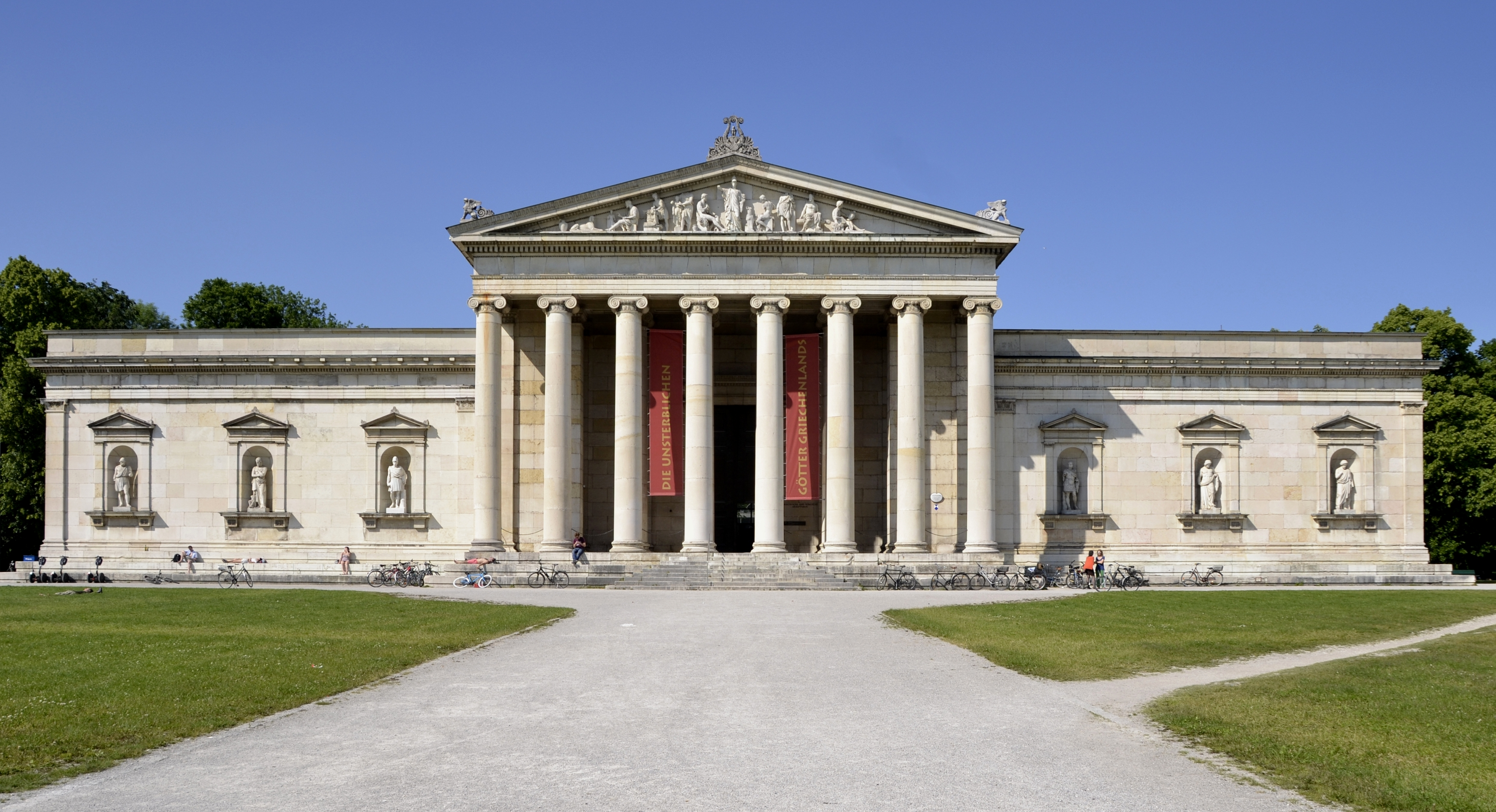
- The Glyptothek in Munich
- Location: Munich, Germany
- Coordinates: 48°08′47″N 11°33′57″E
- Type: Art museum
- Website: www.antike-am-koenigsplatz.mwn.de/en/

The Glyptothek (German: [ɡlʏptʰoˈtʰeːk]) is a museum in Munich, Germany, which was commissioned by the Bavarian King Ludwig I to house his collection of Greek and Roman sculptures (hence γλυπτο- glypto- "sculpture", from the Greek verb γλύφειν glyphein "to carve" and the noun θήκη "container"). It was designed by Leo von Klenze in the neoclassical style, and built from 1816 to 1830. Today the museum is a part of the Kunstareal.

== History ==
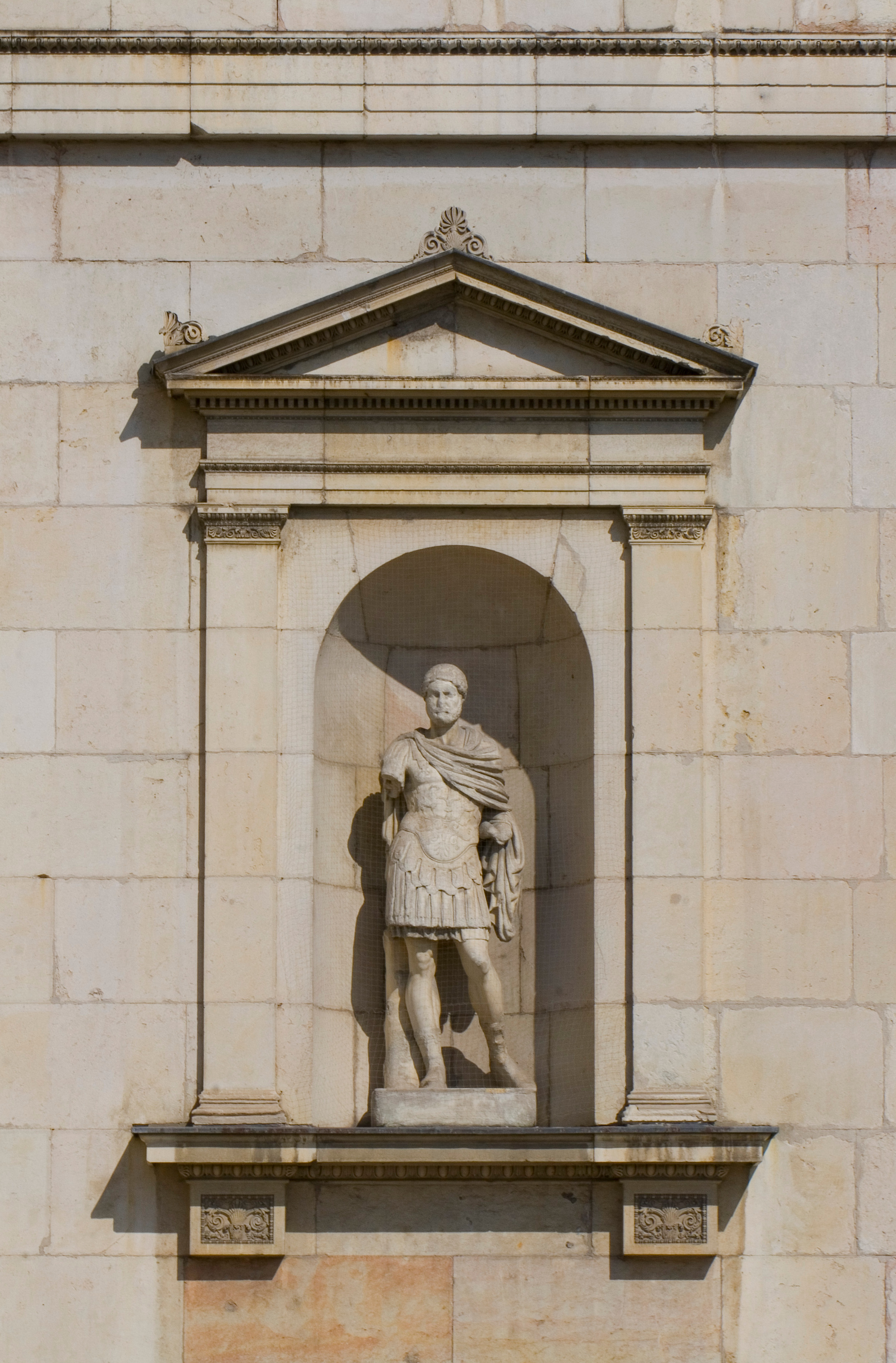
Detail of one of the niches on the façade

The Glyptothek was commissioned by the Crown Prince (later King) Ludwig I of Bavaria alongside other projects, such as the neighboring Königsplatz and the building which houses the State Collection of Greek and Roman Antiquities, as a monument to ancient Greece. He envisioned a "German Athens", in which the ancient Greek culture would be remembered; he had this built in front of the gates of Munich. The Glyptothek is Munich's oldest public museum.

The layout of the Königsplatz complex was designed by the architects Karl von Fischer and Leo von Klenze in 1815, the latter arranged it in the style of a forum, with the Glyptothek on the north side. Colorful frescoes and stuccos made by distinguished artists such as Peter von Cornelius, Clemens von Zimmermann, and Wilhelm von Kaulbach adorned the walls of the museum.

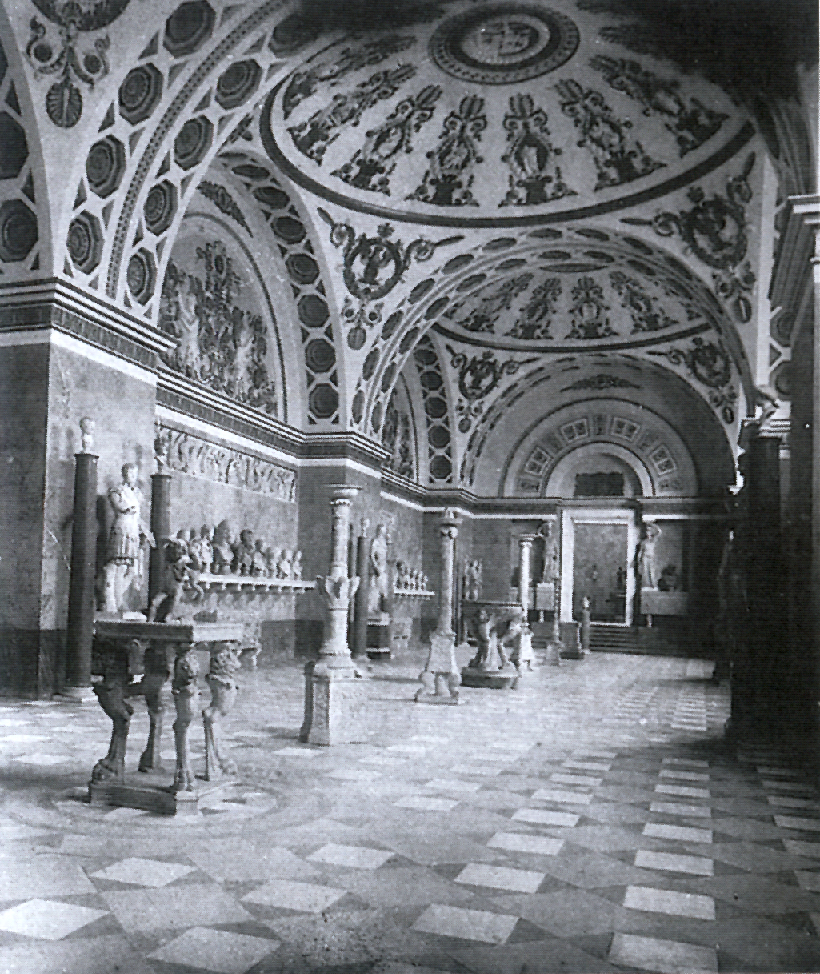
Glyptothek, interior 1900

In the few years between 1806 and the opening of the museum in 1830, Ludwig completed a notable collection of Greek and Roman sculpture. Through his agents, he managed to acquire such pieces as the Medusa Rondanini, the Barberini Faun, and, in 1813, the figures from the Aphaea temple on Aegina.

The Second World War did not destroy much of the artwork in the Glyptothek; but the frescoes did not survive and only lightly plastered bricks were visible after the museum was reopened in 1972. Since the Assyrian Hall erected in the inner court by Klenze in 1864 was not rebuilt, the Assyrian Orthostat reliefs from the palace of king Ashur-nasir-pal II and a lion from the Ishtar Gate of Babylon were moved into the Staatliche Sammlung für Ägyptische Kunst.

From October 2018 until January 2021 the Glyptothek was closed due to renovation works. The reopening was scheduled for January 27, 2021. The work on the second construction phase included the exterior of the Glyptothek and continued until the summer of 2021 while the museum was still open.

== Architecture ==
The museum was designed in the Classical Greek - Italian style. The portico is Ionic, and the outer walls contain niches, in which 18 original Roman and Greek sculptures stand, six on each wall (except the back). The thirteen rectangular, square or round rooms are arranged around a courtyard, the vestibule in the central building dominates the halls of height. In front of the vestibule is the portico of twelve Ionic columns. The overlying gable includes a group of Johann Martin von Wagner. It represents Athena as protector of the plastic arts. The exterior walls are adorned with sculptures in niches, while the windows are open to the interior courtyard. The sculptures represent mythical or historical representatives of the arts, these are in the front of the Königsplatz Daedalus, Prometheus, Hadrian, Pericles, Phidias and Hephaestus. On the western and eastern side of the building there are sculptors of the Renaissance and of the times when the Glyptothek was built, including Bertel Thorvaldsen and Antonio Canova, whose works were once on display earlier in the Hall of the Glyptothek but were later moved to the Neue Pinakothek.

The museum was originally built completely out of marble. However, during World War II the museum was bombed, and later reconstructed. The walls from the interior are composed of red brick and painted with a light plaster. The interior has domed vaulting.

== Collections ==
The Glyptothek contains sculptures dating from the archaic age (c. 650 BC) to the Roman era (c. 550 AD). Other notable sculptures, mosaics and reliefs can also be found here. This collection is complemented by the terracotta and bronze collections in the Staatliche Antikensammlung (State Collection of Greek and Roman Antiquities), which is located opposite the Glyptothek.

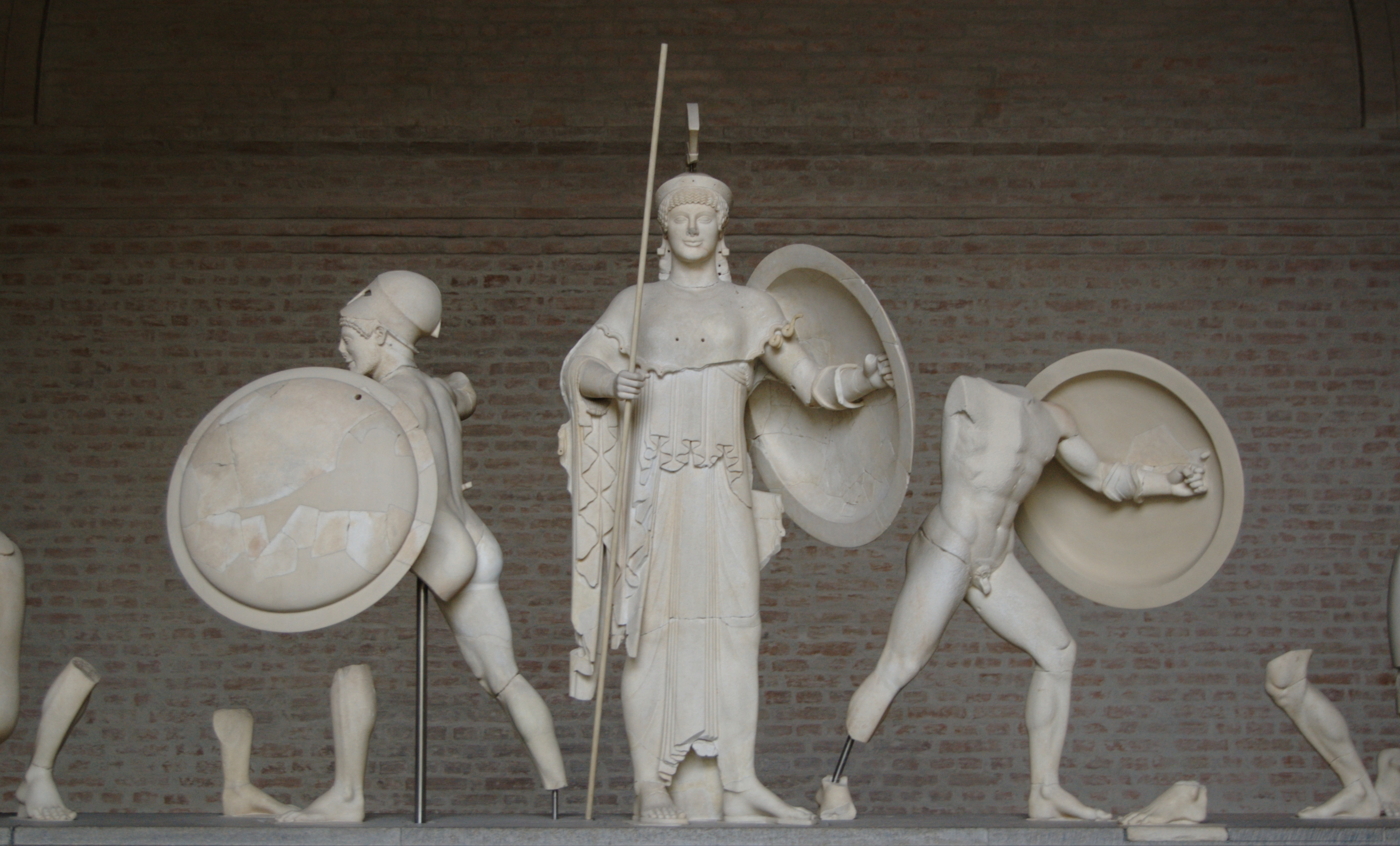
Detail of the Aegina temple figures

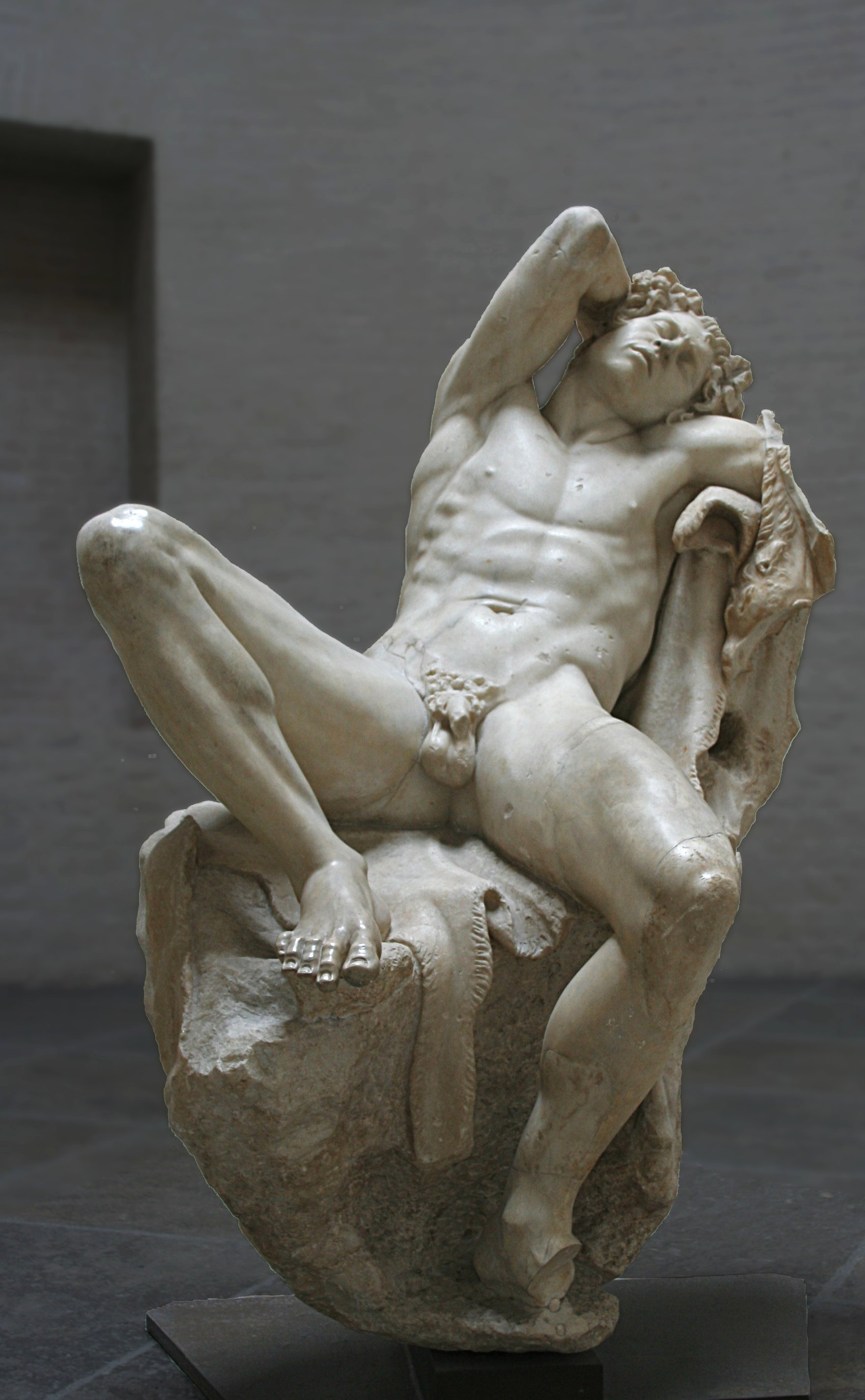
Barberini Faun

=== Archaic period (700-490 BC) ===
Among the most famous sculptures covering Archaic Greece are the Munich Kouros (statue of an adolescent from Attica, c. 540 BC), the Kouros of Tenea (statue of an adolescent from Corinth, c. 560 BC) and the temple figures from Aegina (510-480 BC). Of the latter, there are in fact two sets of similar sculptures at the Glyptothek. As archeologists excavated the site at Aegina, these two sets were discovered, and it was later theorized that the original temple was destroyed during the Peloponnesian War and another temple was erected shortly after in its place. The extant temple of c. 500 BC was built over the remains of an earlier temple of c. 570 BC, which was destroyed by fire c. 510 BC. The elements of this destroyed temple were buried in the infill for the larger, flat terrace of the later temple, and are thus well preserved.

=== Classical period (490–323 BC) ===
To the most famous sculptures of Classical Greece belong the portrait of Homer (460 BC), the so-called Munich King (460 BC), who probably represented Hephaestus, the Statue of Diomedes (430 BC), the Medusa Rondanini (440 BC), the Funeral stele of Mnesarete (380 BC), the Statue of Eirene (370 BC), the grave relief of a youth with his hunting dog (360 BC), a portrait of Plato (348 BC), the Alexander Rondanini (c. 338 BC) and the Ilioneus (c. 320 BC).

=== Hellenistic period (323–146 BC) ===
The most famous sculpture representing the Hellenistic period is the Barberini Faun (220 BC). Among the famous Roman copies of Greek sculptures are the Boy with the Goose (c. 250 BC) and the Drunken Woman (attributed to Myron of Thebes; c. 200 BC). The marble portrait of Alexander the Great (Alexander Schwarzenberg), with which the Hellenistic period began, dates from c. 330 BC.

=== Roman period (150 BC – 550 AD) ===
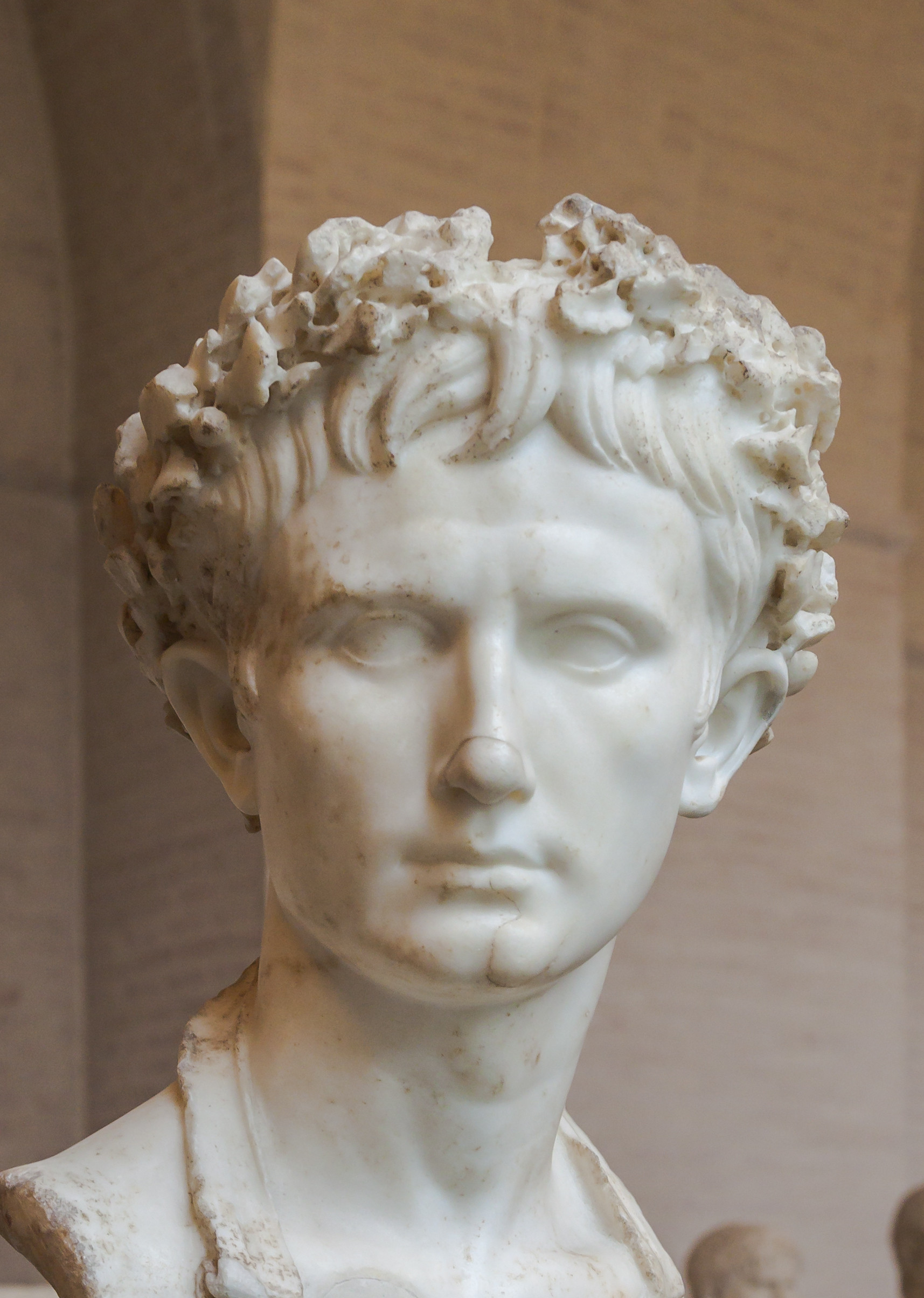
Bust of Emperor Augustus (Augustus Bevilacqua), wearing the Civic Crown

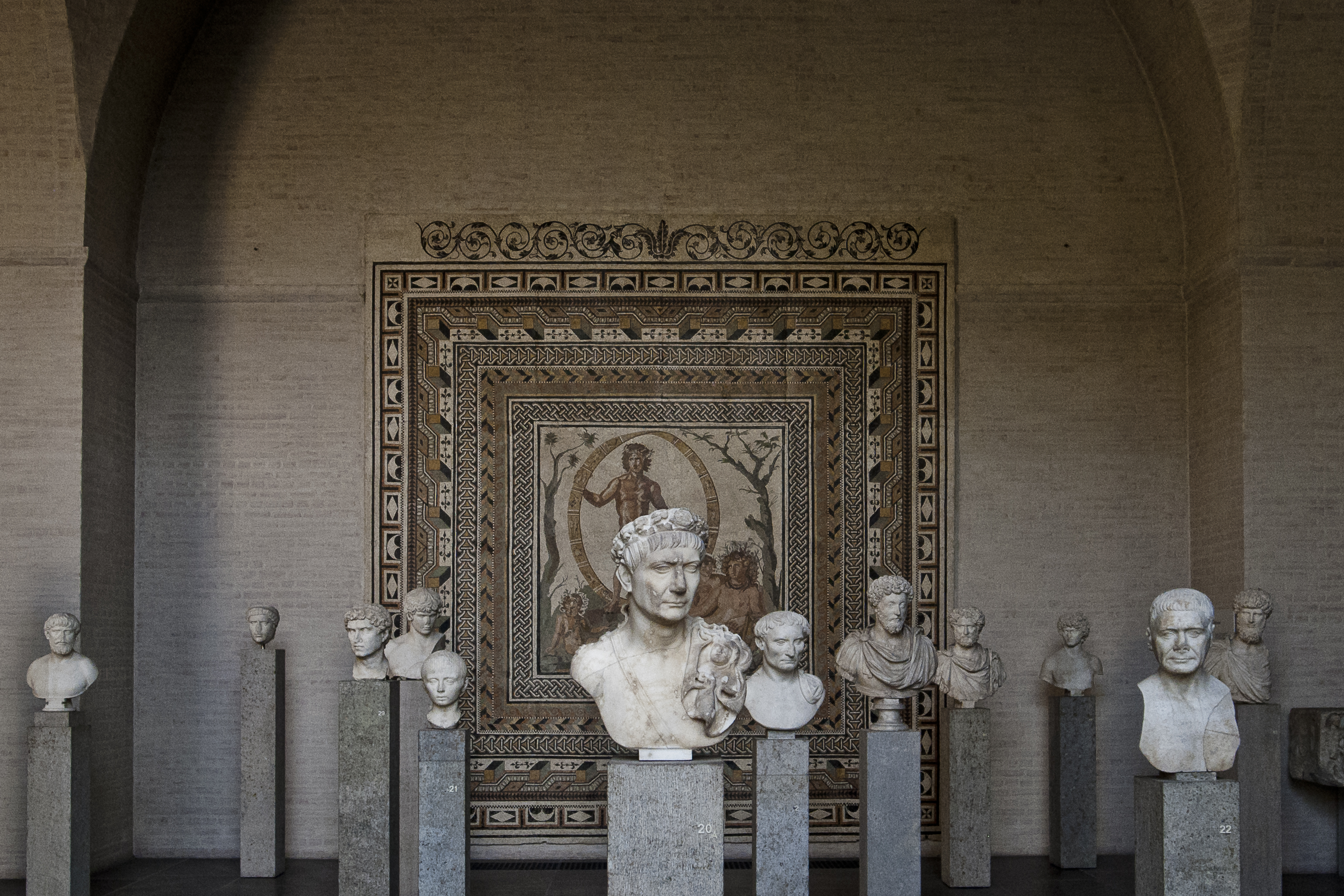
An overview of the room containing the Roman period art with the bust of Emperor Trajan (reign 98–117 AD) in the front

The Glyptothek keeps a large collection of Roman busts, among the most famous ones are the busts of Gaius Marius and Sulla (c. 40 BC), the Emperors Augustus (c. 40 AD), Nero (65 AD), Septimius Severus (200 AD) and his wife Julia Domna (195 AD). A heroised statue portrays Domitian as prince (70/80 AD). With the support of the cultural foundations of the German states, the Glyptothek was able to acquire in 2017 a bust of Caligula (c. 40 AD), excavated in Córdoba in 1937. The Emperor, like the Munich portrait of his ancestor Augustus (Augustus Bevilacqua), bears the corona civica. As a head of Tiberius has long been in the Glyptothek and a head of Claudius (Claudius Jucker) was donated in 2012, the Glyptothek owns portraits of all five emperors of the Julio-Claudian dynasty. To the major attractions belong also a colossal statue of Apollo (1st/2nd centuries AD) from a Roman villa in Tuscany, several Roman sarcophagus reliefs and mosaic floors. The marble statue of Artemis as mistress of the animals dates from 50 AD. An imitation of the classical style is the Roman head of a youth in bronze (ca Christ's birth). The Roman period is also represented by several reliefs (Relief of gladiators, 1st century BC) and mosaics (Aion mosaic, c. 200–250 AD).

== Gallery ==
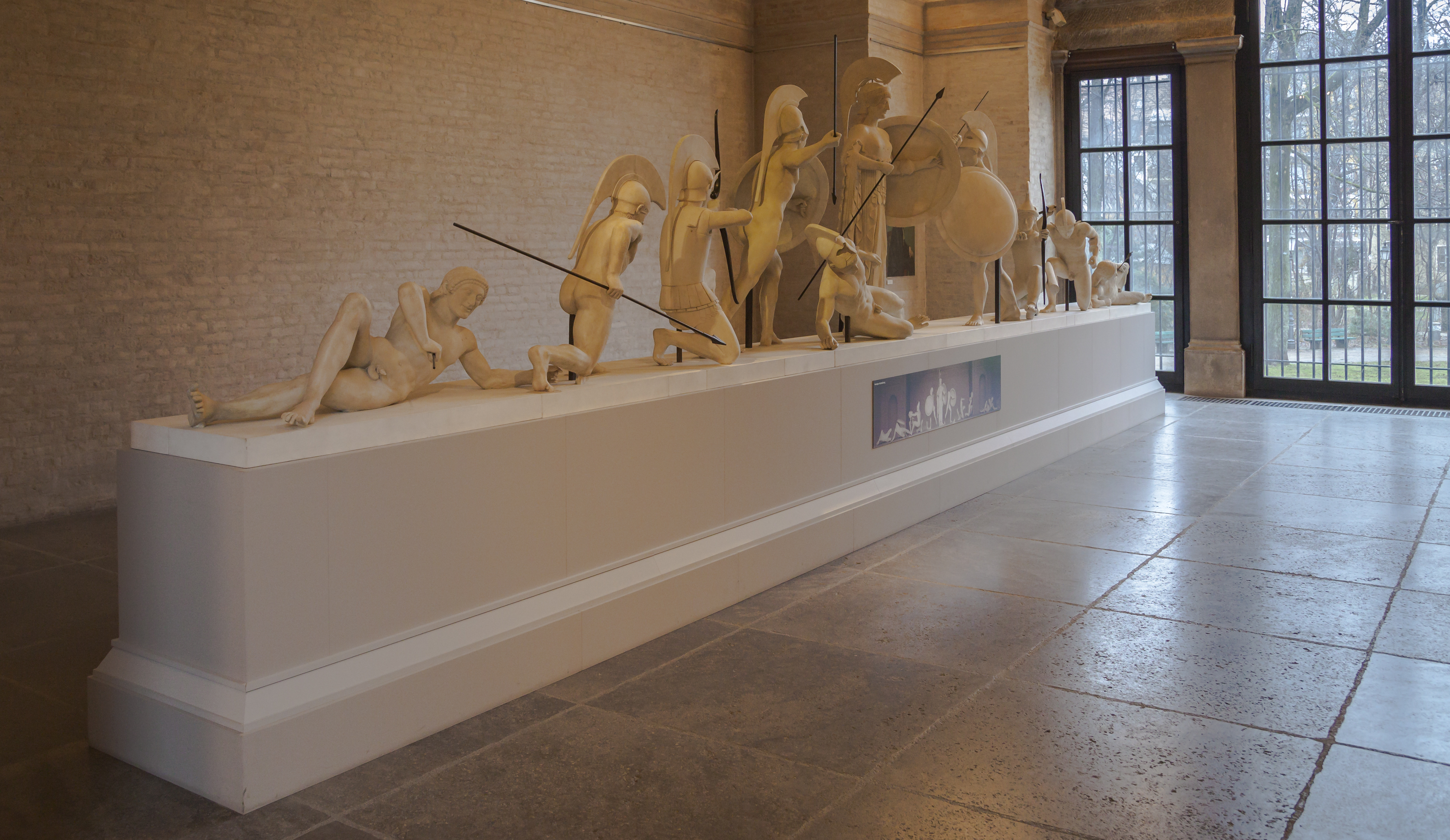
Figures of the Aphai temple

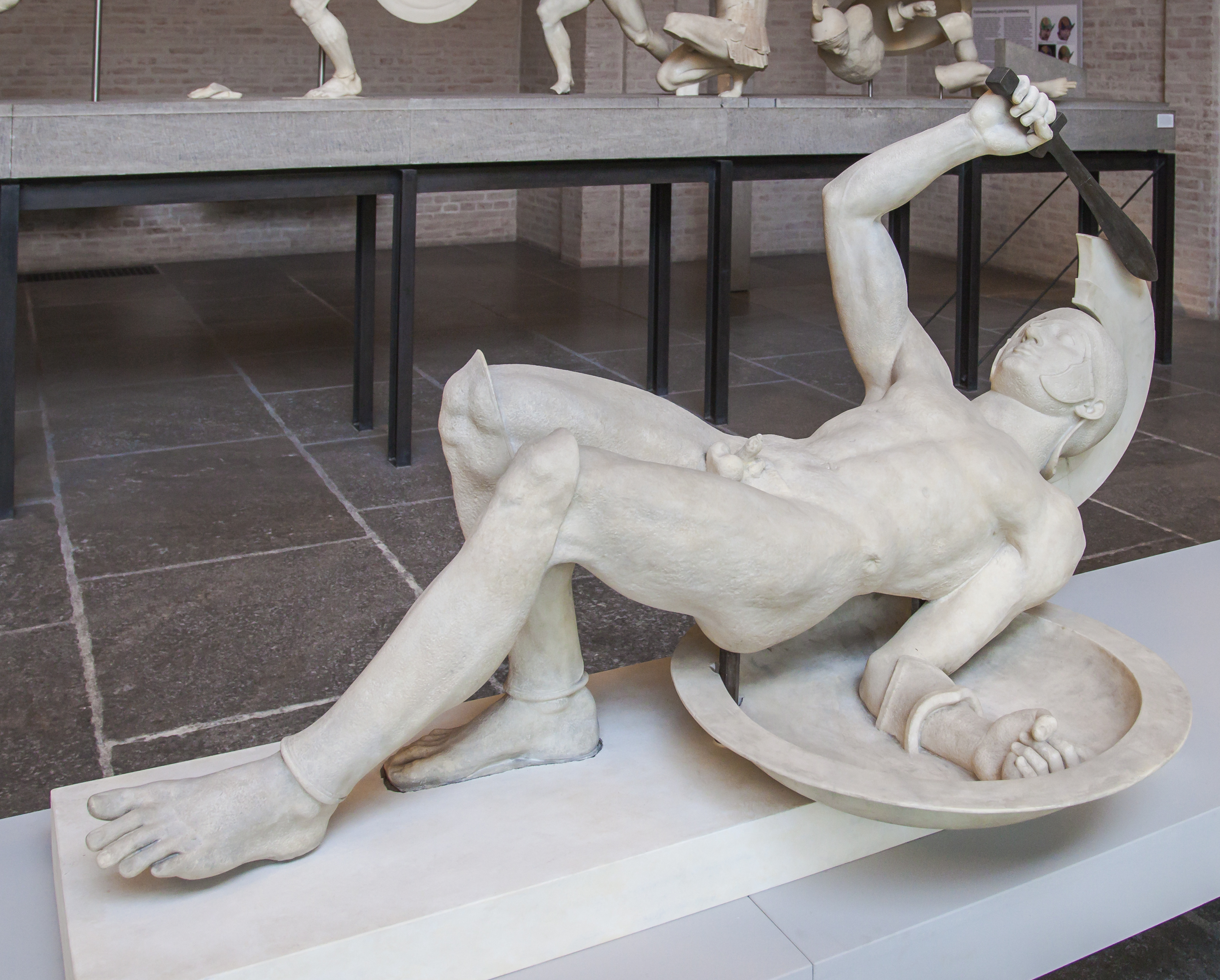
Pediment of the Aphai temple

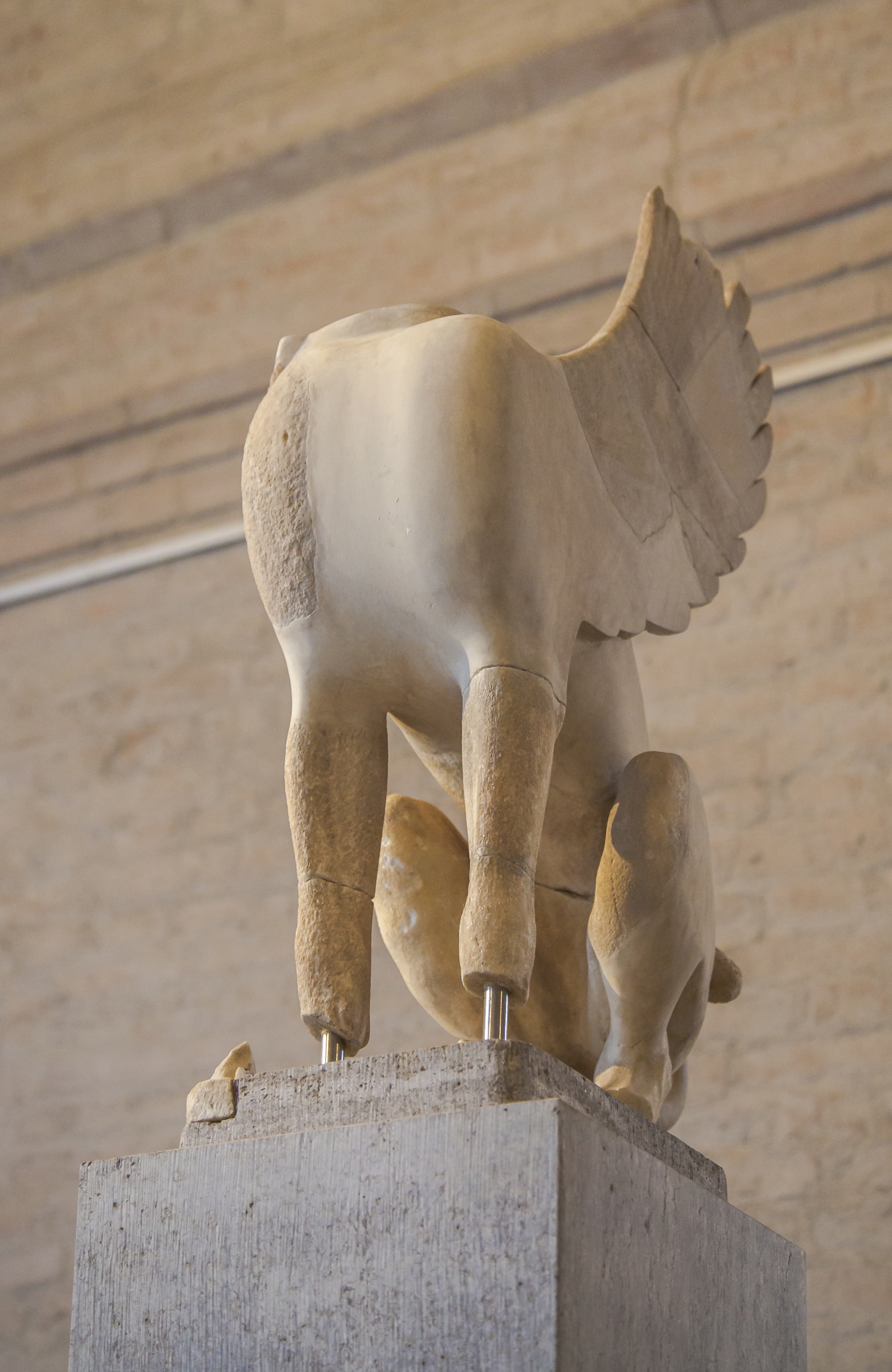
Headless sphinx

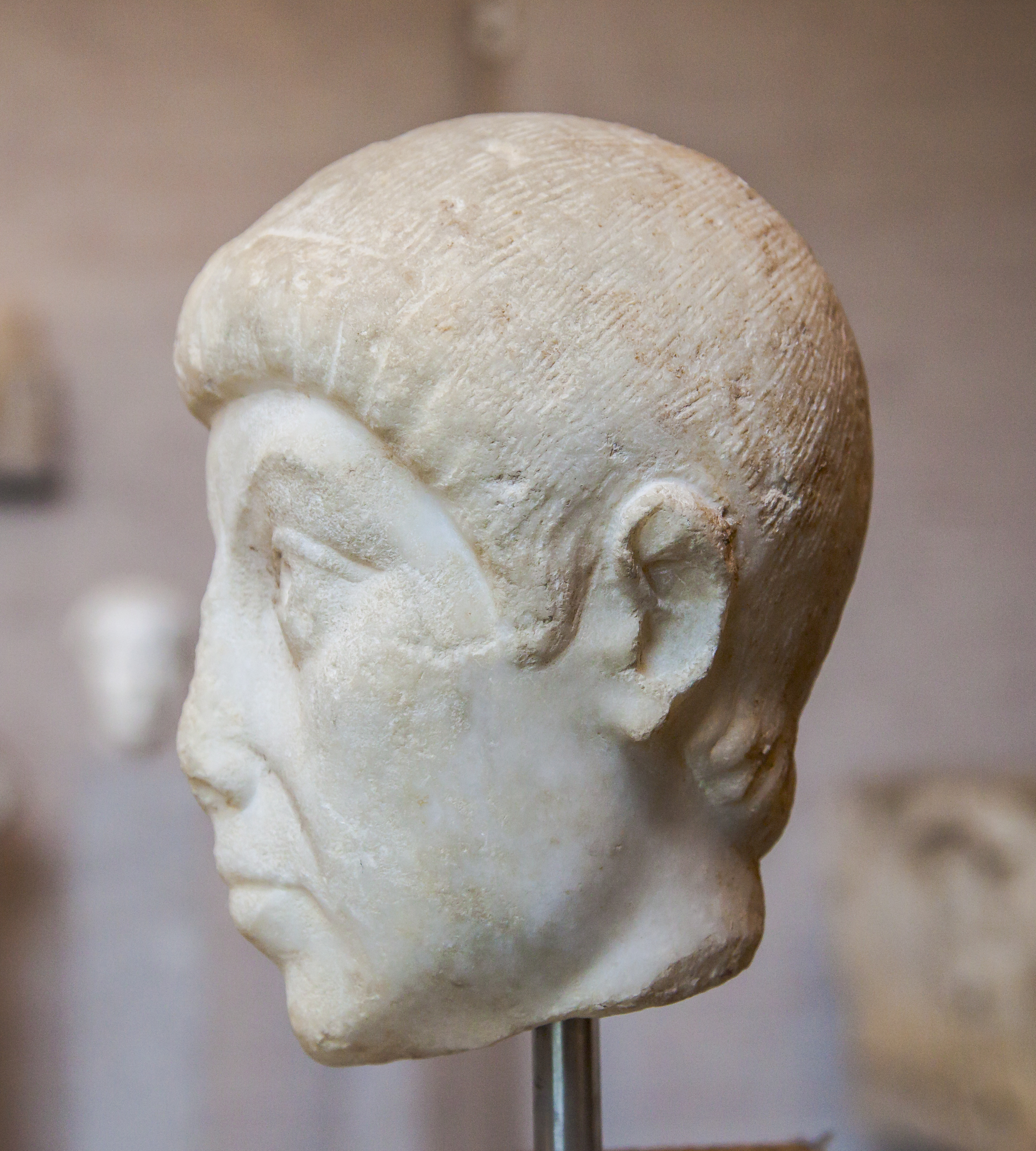
Bust of Roman man

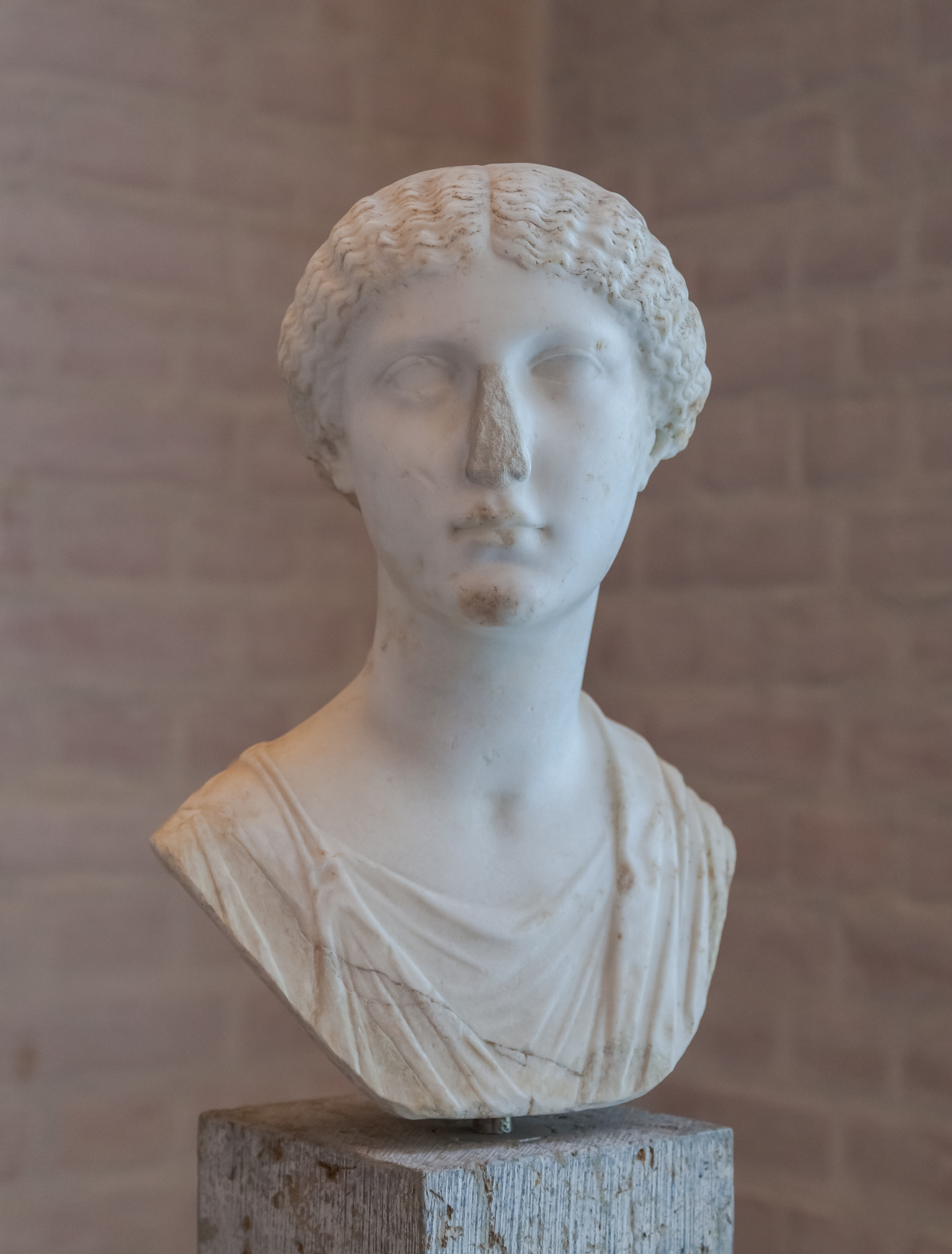
Bust of Roman woman

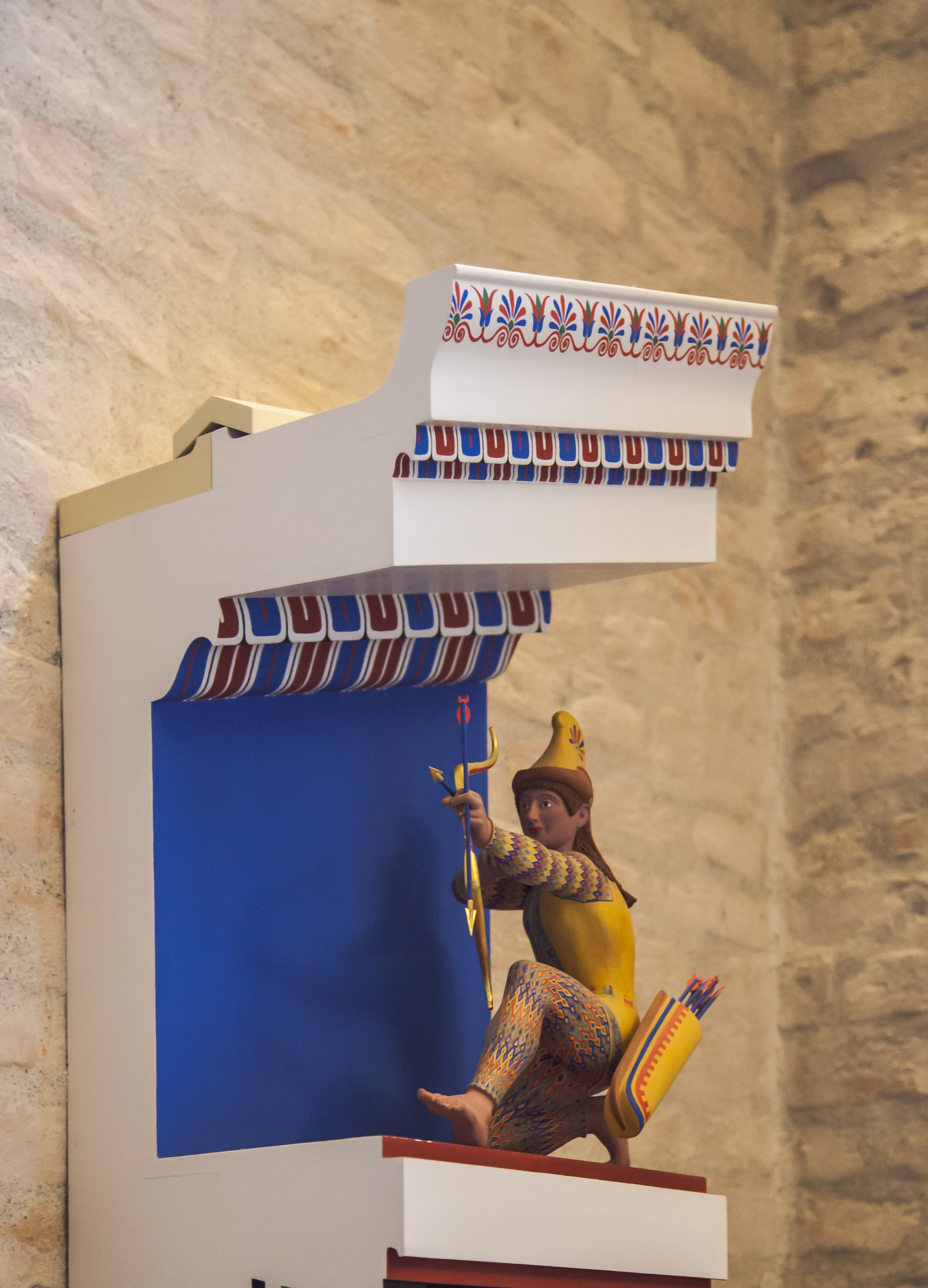
Colourful Gods exhibition

== See also ==
- Propylaea (Munich)
- Konzerthaus Berlin
