= Kunstareal =

Museum quarter in Munich, Germany

Coordinates: 48°08′56″N 11°34′19″E

The Kunstareal (German: [ˈkʊnst.aʁeˌaːl], "art district") is a museum quarter in the city centre of Munich, Germany.

== Area of arts ==
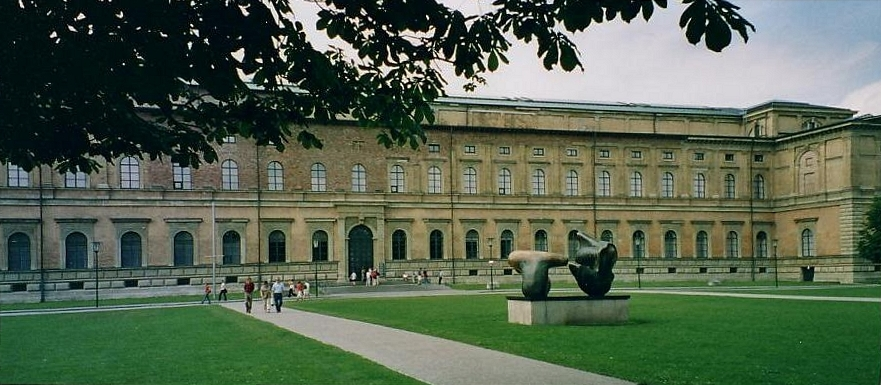
Alte Pinakothek

It consists of the three "Pinakotheken" galleries (Alte Pinakothek, Neue Pinakothek and Pinakothek der Moderne), the Glyptothek, the Staatliche Antikensammlungen (both museums are specialized in Greek and Roman art), the Lenbachhaus, the Museum Brandhorst (a private collection of modern art) and several galleries. Also the Staatliche Sammlung für Ägyptische Kunst (the state collection of Egypt art) was moved to the Kunstareal in 2013. The history of the museums in this area of Munich began in 1816 with the erection of the Glyptothek at Königsplatz and was completed with the new building for the Egyptian Museum (2012) and the extension of the Lenbachhaus (2013).

Close to the Pinakothek der Moderne the neo-classical Palais Dürckheim (constructed in 1842–1844) served at times as a building dedicated to bringing art closer to the visitors, while the adjoining Türkentor (1826), the gate of a demolished royal caserne, is set to become a display window for temporary contemporary art. As of 2009 a general project plan is under discussion to ensure the integration of the different museum buildings and to improve the access to the art district from the inner city.

== The museums ==
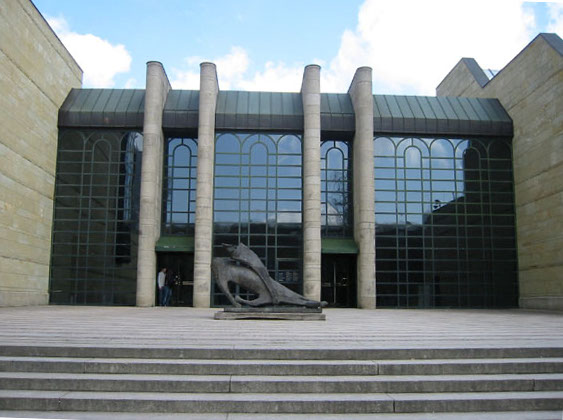
Neue Pinakothek

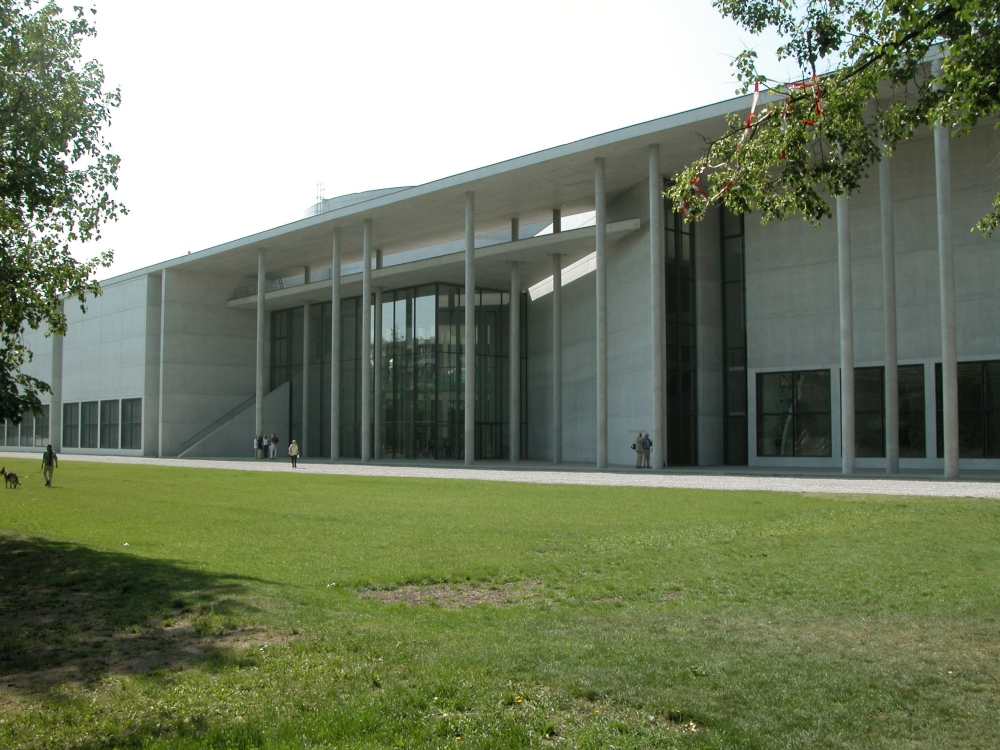
Pinakothek der Moderne

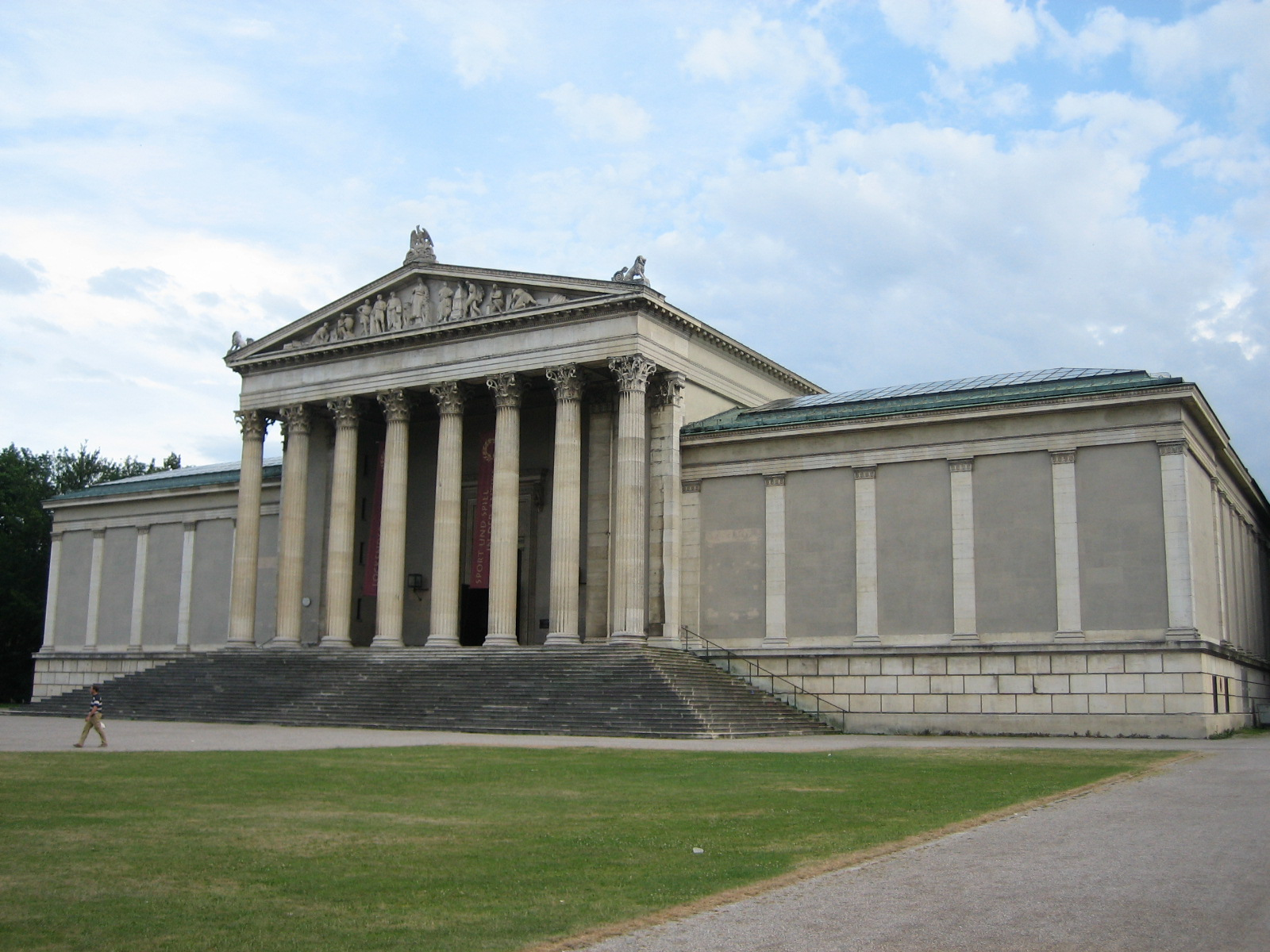
Bavarian State Collection of Antiquities

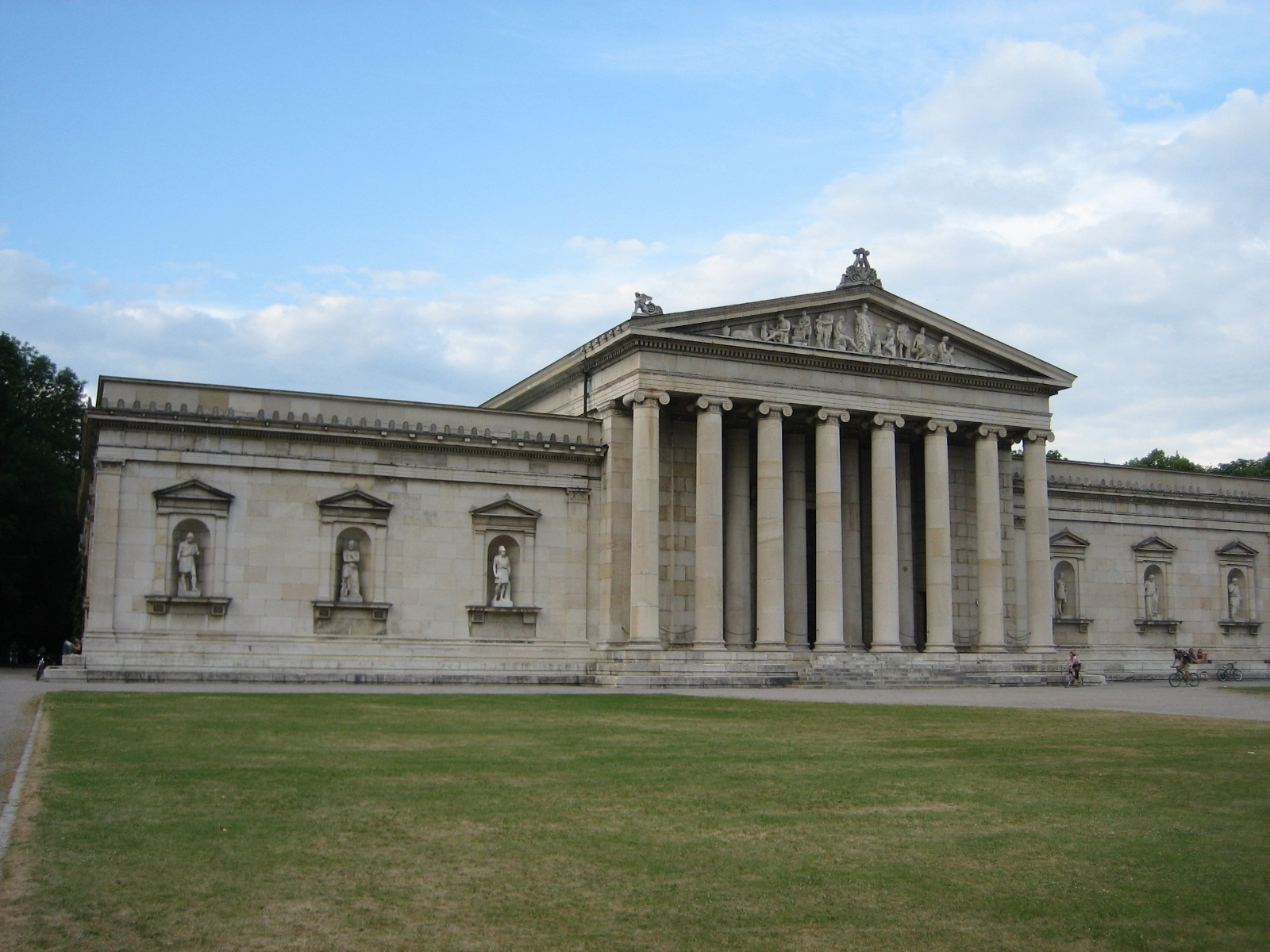
Glyptothek

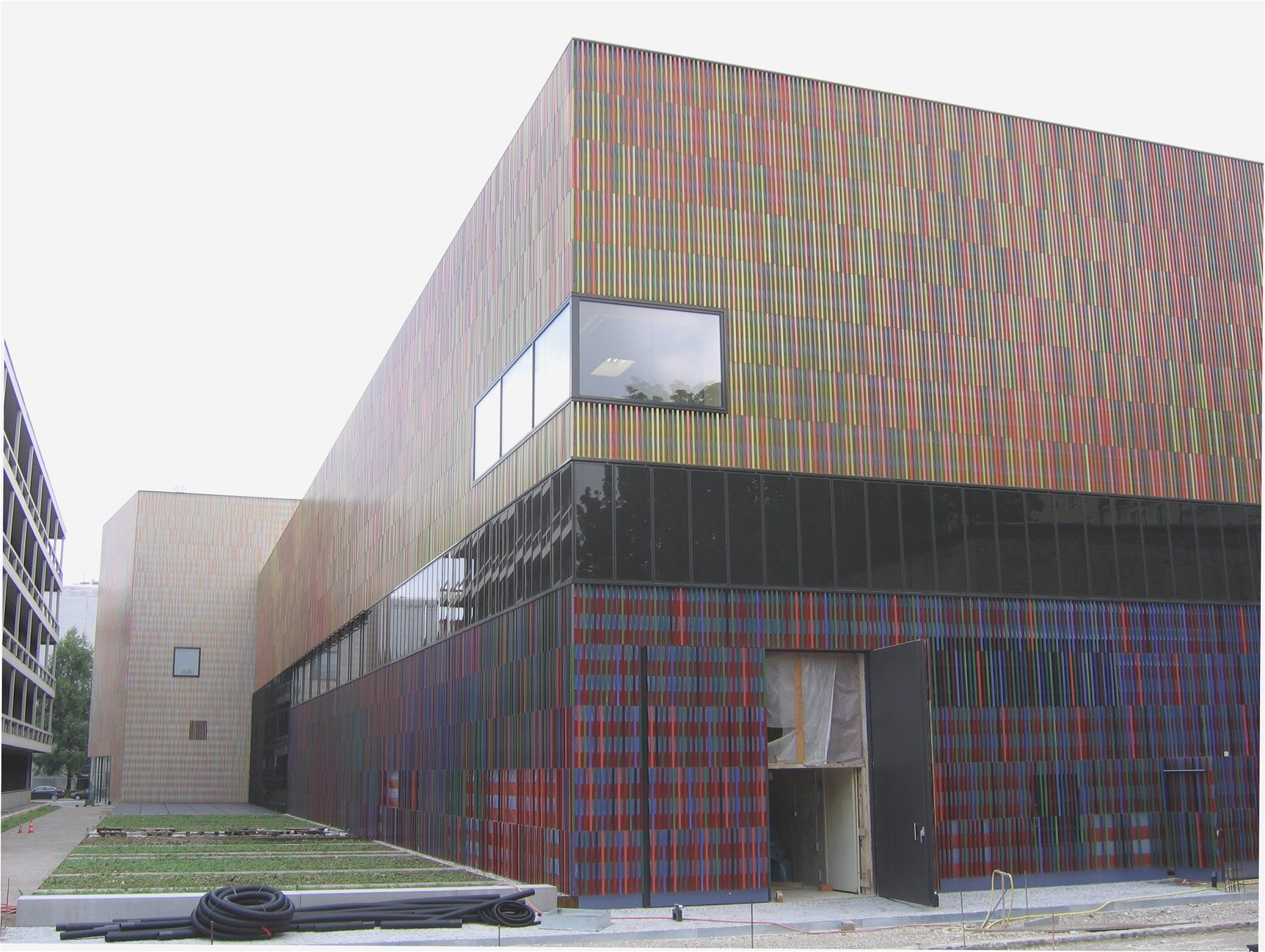
Museum Brandhorst

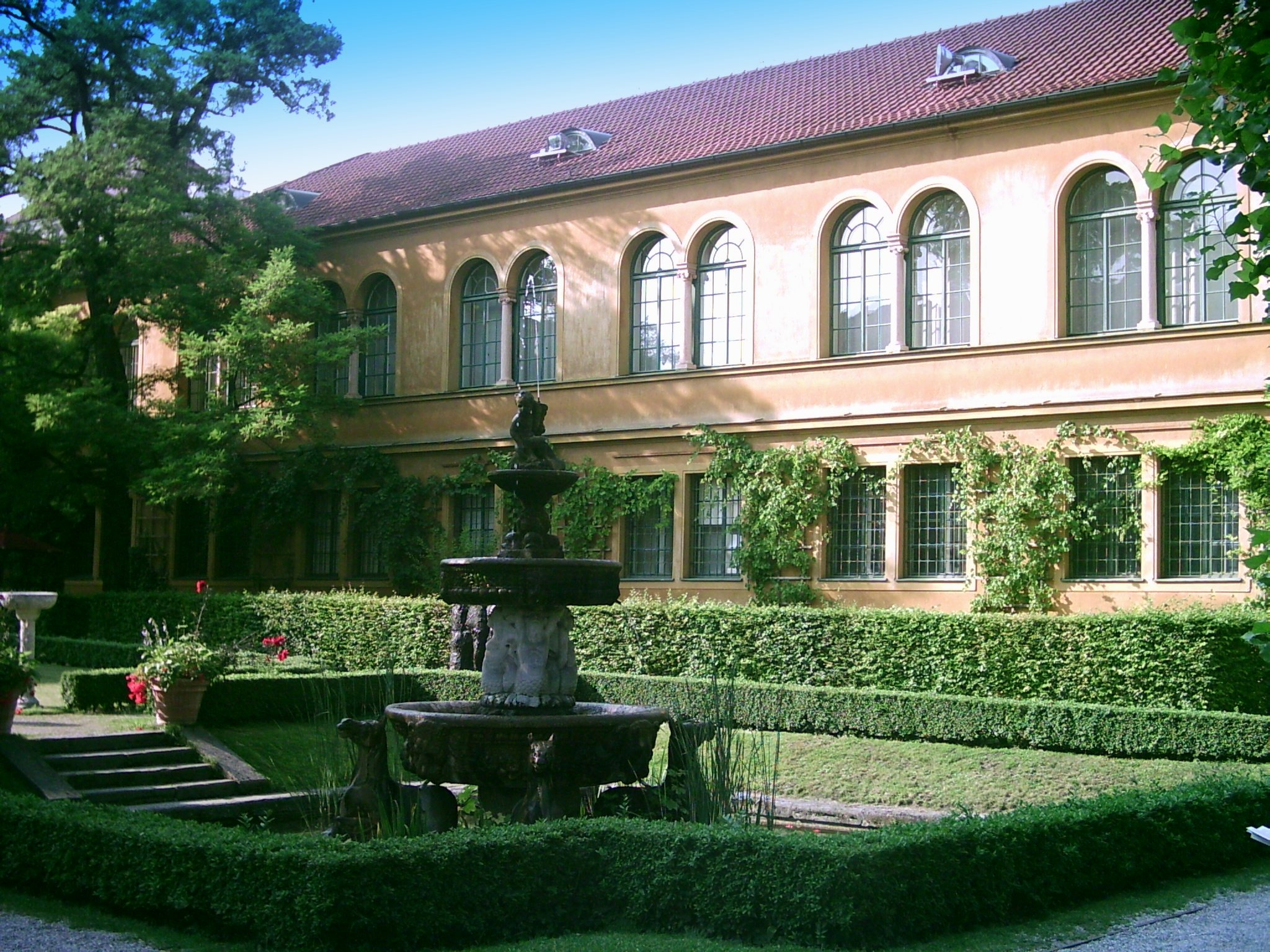
Lenbachhaus

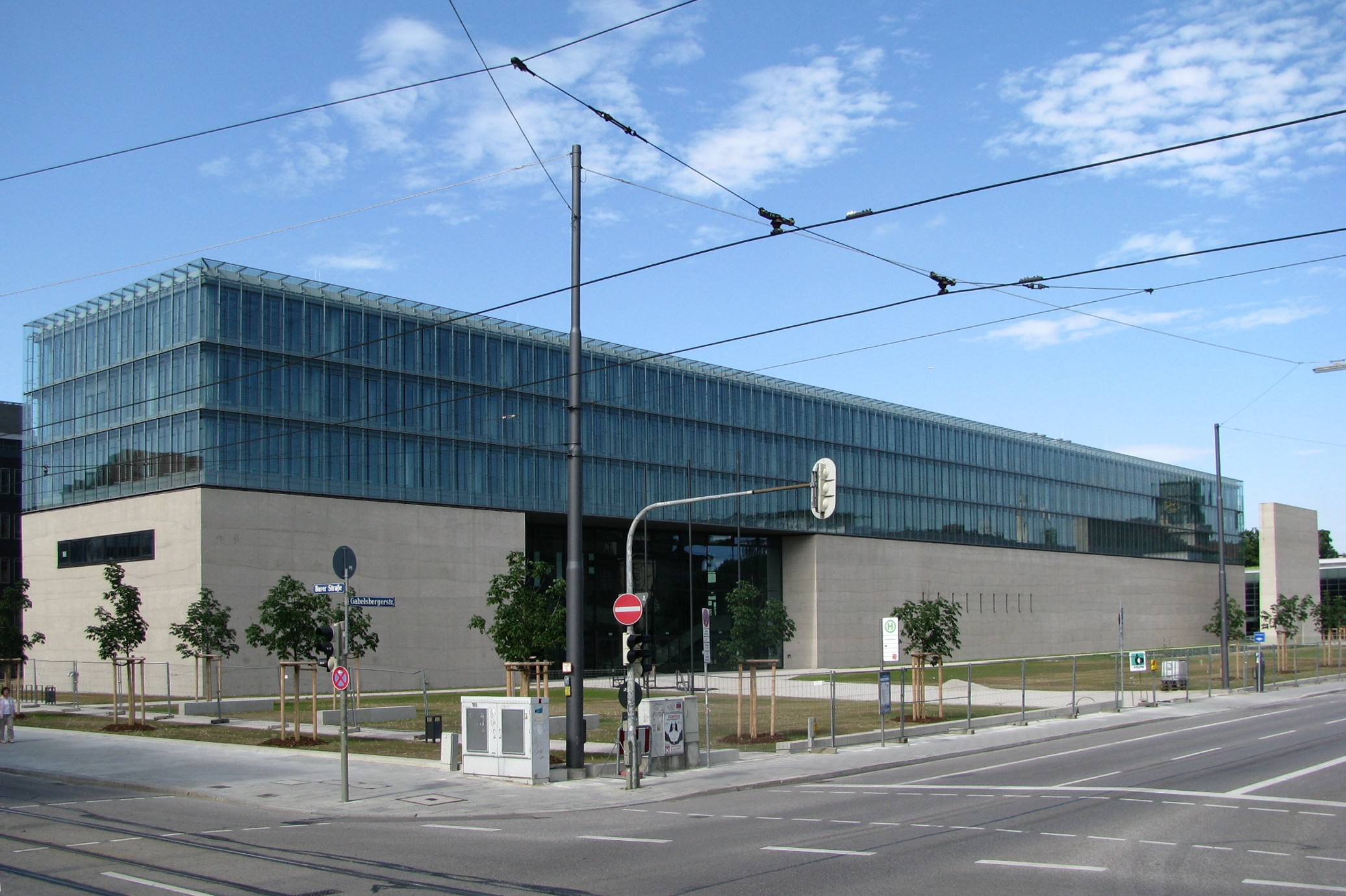
Egyptian Museum (right entrance area)

The Alte Pinakothek's rather monolithic structure contains a treasure trove of the works of European masters between the 14th and 18th centuries. The collection reflects the eclectic tastes of the Wittelsbachs over four centuries, and is sorted by schools over two sprawling floors. Major displays include Albrecht Dürer's Christ-like Self-Portrait, his The Four Apostles, Raphael's paintings The Canigiani Holy Family and Madonna Tempi as well as Peter Paul Rubens self-portrait Honeysuckle Bower and his two-storey-high Judgment Day. The gallery houses one of the world's most comprehensive Rubens collections. The Madonna of the Carnation is the only painting of Leonardo da Vinci in a German gallery.

The Neue Pinakothek is especially famous for its comprehensive collection of paintings of Impressionism from Pierre-Auguste Renoir, Édouard Manet, Claude Monet, Paul Cézanne, Paul Gauguin, Edgar Degas, Vincent van Gogh and many others.

The Pinakothek der Moderne unifies the Bavarian State Collection of Modern and Contemporary Arts, the National Collection of Works on Paper and the Museum for Design and Applied Arts with the Munich Technical University's Museum of Architecture in one building and is deemed one of the most important and popular museums of modern art in Europe. It houses indeed the largest collection of industrial design. The Collection of Works on Paper ranges from masterpieces of Albrecht Dürer, Rembrandt, Michelangelo and Leonardo da Vinci to Paul Cézanne, Henri Matisse, Paul Klee and David Hockney.

It is owned by the nearby Staatliche Graphische Sammlung München, a world-renowned collection of 400,000 prints, engravings and drawings dating back to the Renaissance. The Collection of Modern Art keeps a large collection of paintings of Pablo Picasso, Max Beckmann and of the painters of Die Brücke.

Before World War I, the Blaue Reiter group of artists worked in Munich. Many of their works can now be seen at the Lenbachhaus.

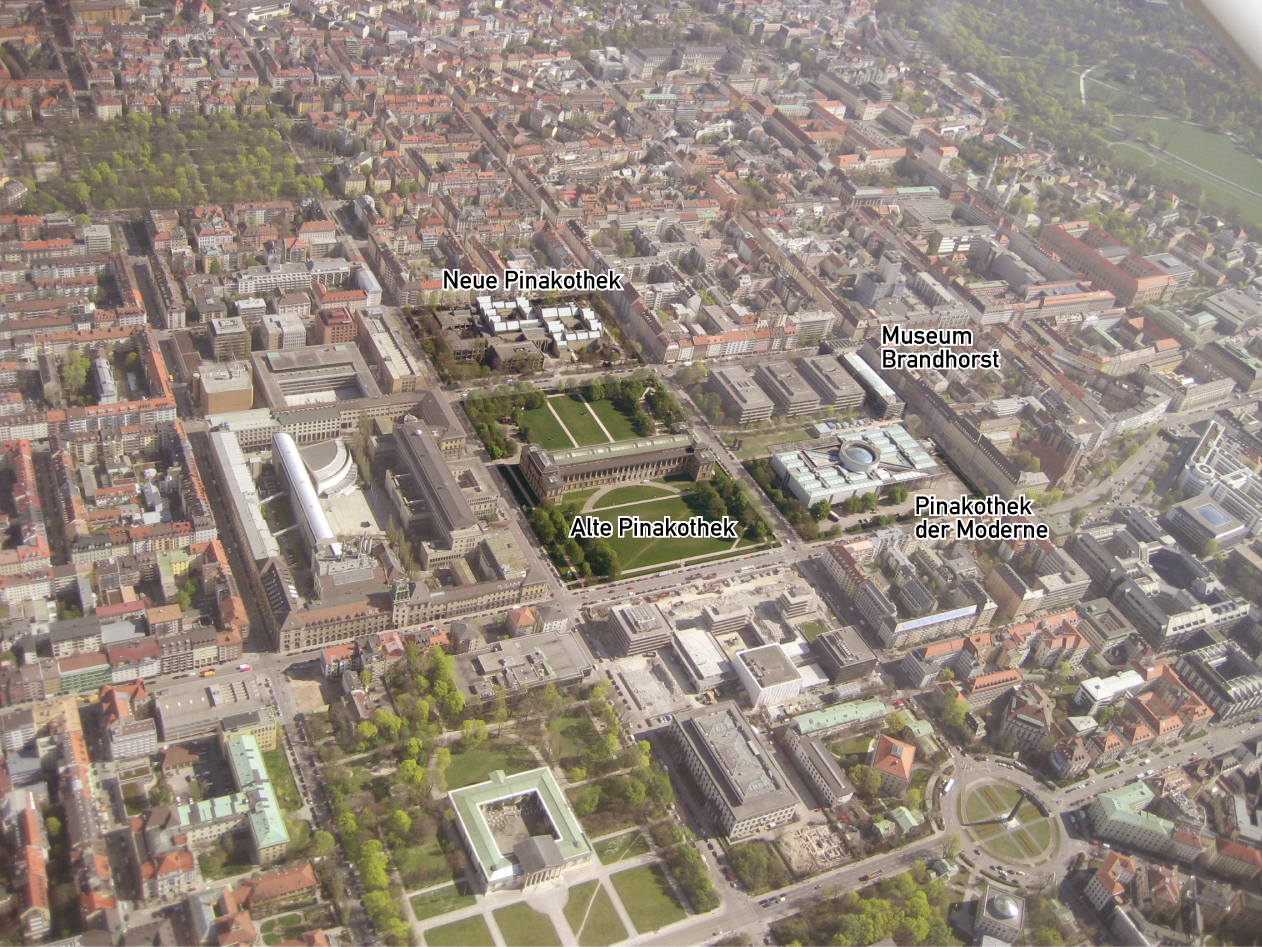
Pinakotheken in the Kunstareal

The modern Museum Brandhorst focus on the work of Andy Warhol and Cy Twombly.

An important collection of Greek and Roman art is held in the Glyptothek and the Staatliche Antikensammlung (State Antiquities Collection). King Ludwig I managed to acquire such famous pieces as the Medusa Rondanini, the Barberini Faun and the figures from the Temple of Aphaea on Aegina for the Glyptothek. The internationally renowned collection of antique pottery is outstanding. The Museum für Abgüsse klassischer Bildwerke displays the world's most famous ancient Greek and Roman sculptures as plaster casts.

The Kunstareal was further augmented by the completion of the Staatliche Sammlung für Ägyptische Kunst (Egyptian Museum). This museum displays exhibits from all periods of Ancient Egypt's history but also reliefs from Assyria and a lion from the Ishtar Gate of Babylon.

Nearby the Kunstareal are several natural scientific museums of the Bavarian state, like the Paläontologisches Museum München, the Geological Museum and the Museum Reich der Kristalle as the public part of the "Mineralogische Staatssammlung Muenchen" (Bavarian State Collection for Mineralogy).
