= Leo von Klenze =

German architect and painter (1784–1864)

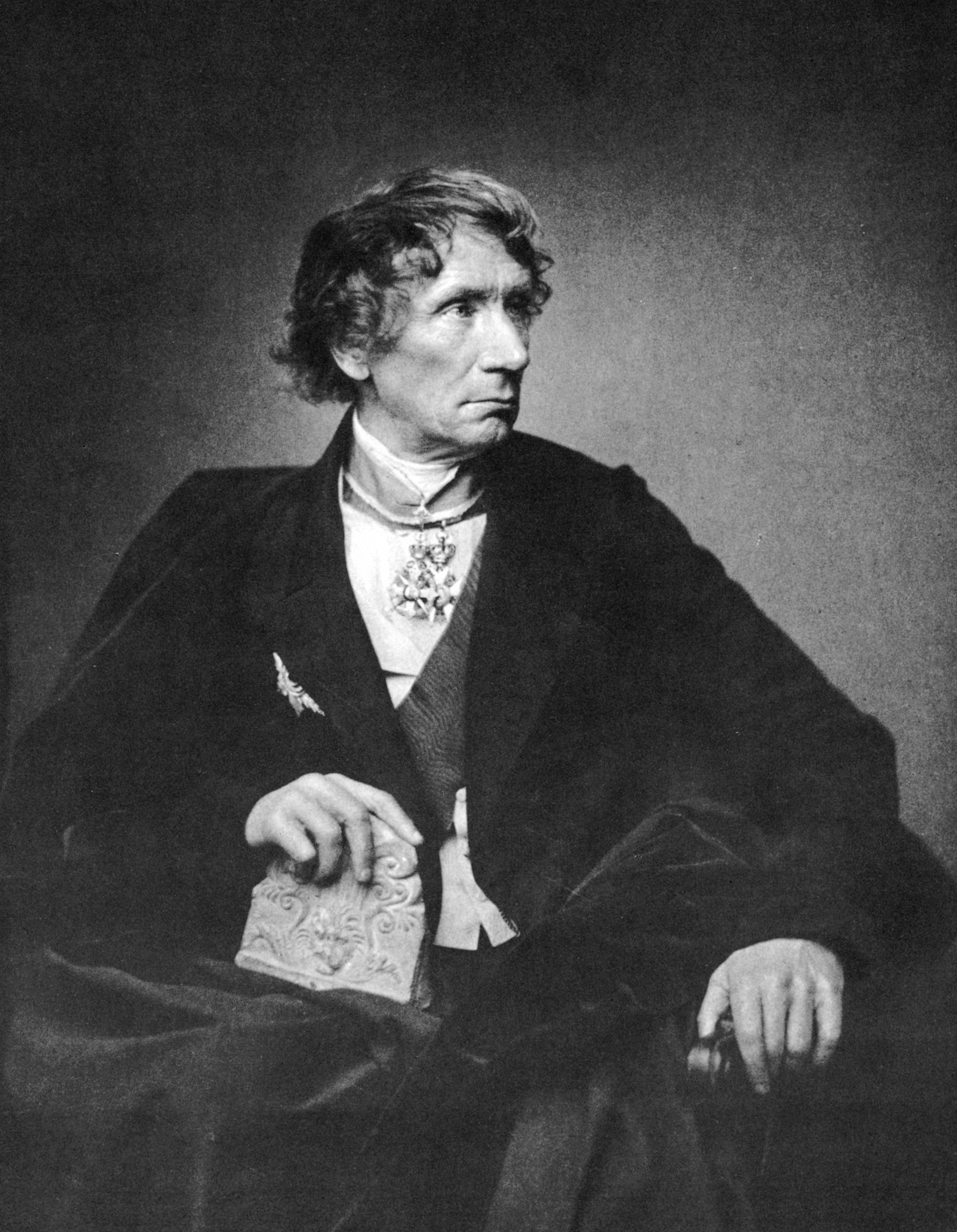
- Leo von Klenze
- Born: Franz Karl Leopold Klenze; 29 February 1784; Schladen, Duchy of Brunswick-Lüneberg, Holy Roman Empire
- Died: 26 January 1864 (aged 79); Munich, Kingdom of Bavaria, German Confederation
- Resting place: Alter Südfriedhof, Munich, Germany
- Occupations: Architect; painter

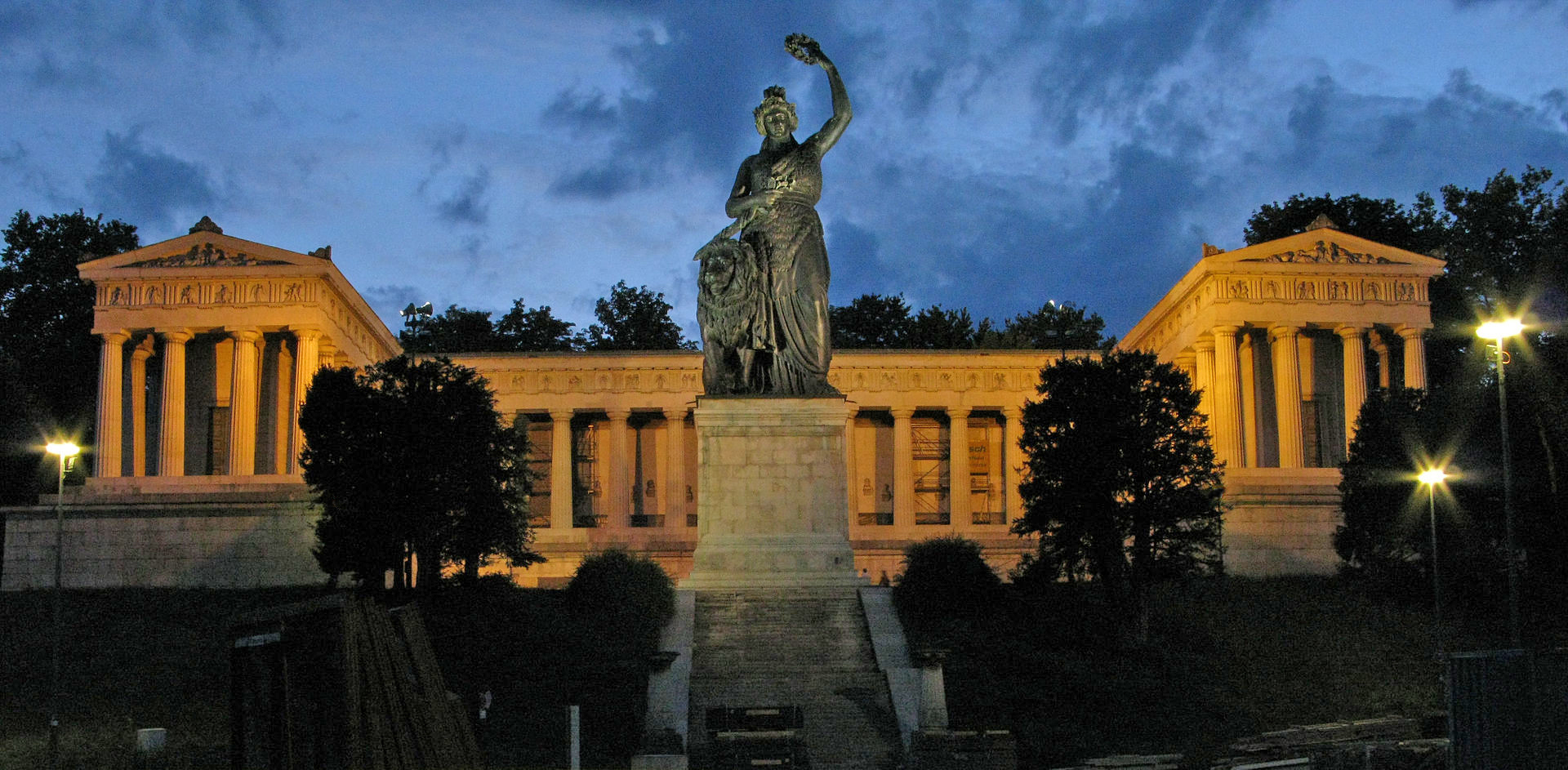
Ruhmeshalle in Munich

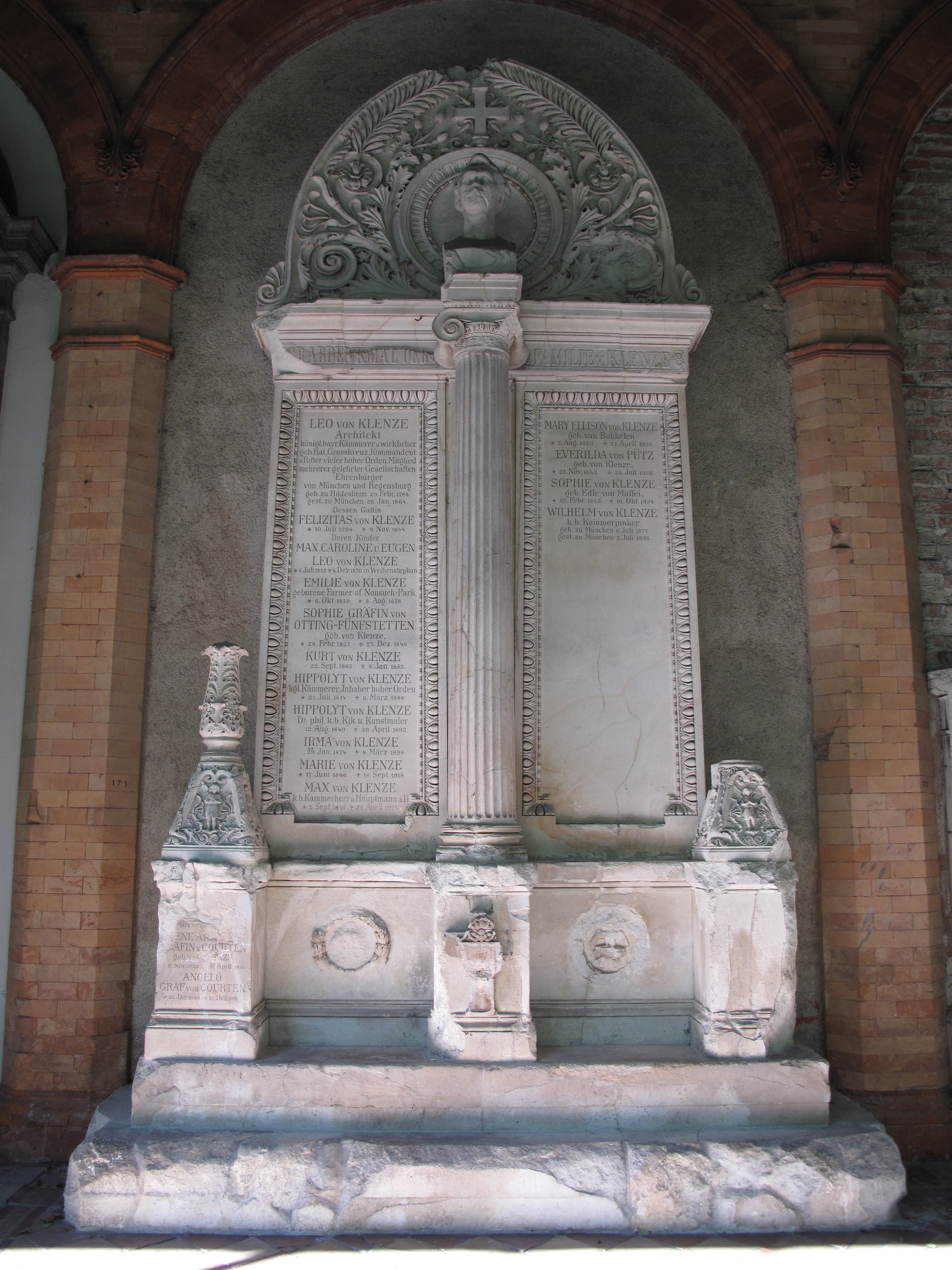
Klenze's grave in Munich

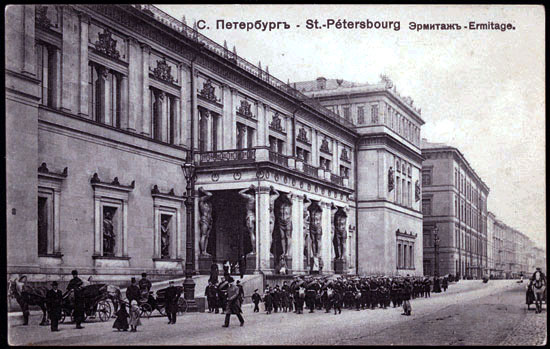
The New Hermitage, St. Petersburg, Russia, was one of the first museums designed in 1838 by Klenze specifically to house art collections (1905).

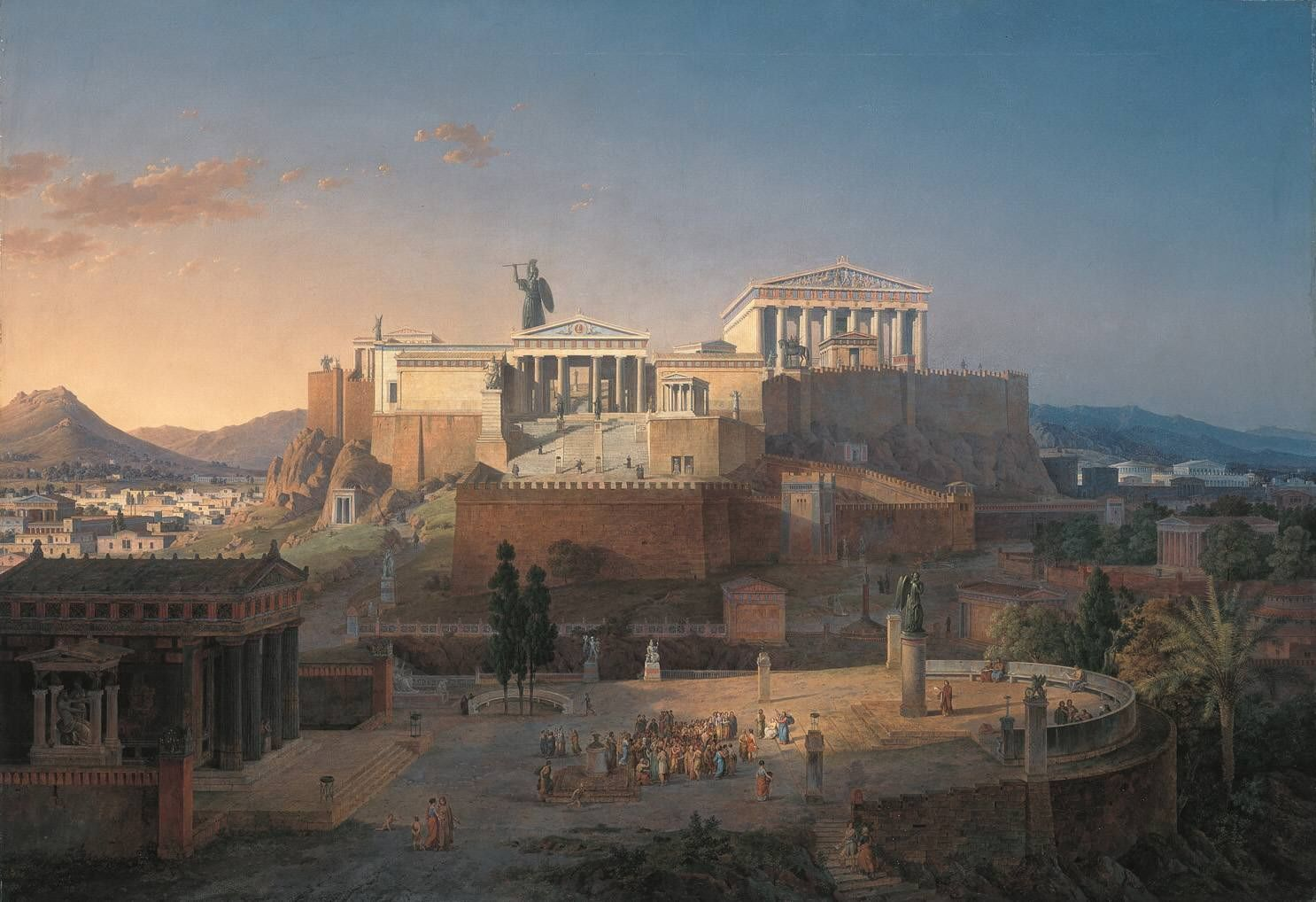
Painting of an idealized reconstruction of the Acropolis and Areios Pagos in Athens, by von Klenze (1846)

Leo von Klenze (born Franz Karl Leopold Klenze; 29 February 1784 – 26 January 1864) was a German architect and painter. He was the court architect of Ludwig I of Bavaria.

Klenze was a devotee of Neoclassicism and one of the most prominent representatives of Greek Revival style.

== Biography ==
Leo von Klenze studied architecture and public building finance under Friedrich Gilly in Berlin, and worked as an apprentice to Charles Percier and Pierre François Léonard Fontaine in Paris. Between 1808 and 1813, he was a court architect of Jérôme Bonaparte, King of Westphalia. He later moved to Bavaria and began work as court architect of Ludwig I in 1816.

Ludwig I's passion for Hellenism shaped the architectural style of Klenze. He built many neoclassical buildings in Munich, including the Ruhmeshalle and Monopteros temple. He designed the layout of Königsplatz, a neoclassical square in Munich. Near Regensburg, he built the Walhalla temple, named after Valhalla.

Klenze designed and arranged museum galleries in Munich, including the Glyptothek, Ludwig I's museum for ancient sculpture, and the Alte Pinakothek, a painting gallery for the pictures of the Wittelsbach collection that opened in 1836. The Alte Pinakothek was situated in an open park land, the Kunstareal, and became a national gallery. The functional logic and the modernity of the Alte Pinakothek were much admired. The Alte Pinakothek was acknowledged as the most advanced museum building in Europe and Klenze was invited to London in 1836 by the House of Commons. There, was interviewed about Bavarian cultural policies and the Alte Pinakothek. Klenze detailed the educational and political aspects of the Munich museums, which were free to the public.

When Greece won its independence, Ludwig I's son Otto became the country's first king. Klenze was invited to Athens to submit plans of city reconstruction in the style of Ancient Greece. In 1838, Nicholas I of Russia commissioned Klenze to design a building for the Hermitage Museum, a public museum to display the collection of antiquities, paintings, coins and medals, cameos, prints and drawings, and books that had been assembled by the House of Romanov.

Klenze was not only an architect, but also an accomplished painter. He depicted ancient buildings in many of his paintings, serving as models for his own architectural projects. Klenze studied ancient architecture during his travels to Italy and Greece. He also participated in excavations of ancient buildings in Athens and submitted proposals for the restoration of the Acropolis.

Klenze collected works of important contemporary German painters. He sold his collection, including 58 landscapes and genre paintings, to Ludwig I of Bavaria in 1841. These paintings form the core of the Neue Pinakothek museum's collection.

Klenze married Maria Felicitas Blangini (1790–1844), a beauty at the court of Ludwig I. Their granddaughter Irene Athenais von Klenze became Countess Courten (1850–1916).

Klenze died in 1864 and was buried in the Alter Südfriedhof in Munich.

== Paintings ==
- Landscape with the Castle of Massa di Carrara, 1827
- Reconstruction of the Acropolis and Areopagus in Athens, 1846
- Der Camposanto in Pisa
- Landschaft auf Capri
- Der Kreuzgang von San Giovanni in Laterano in Rom
- Der Palazzo Rufolo in Ravello
- Porto Venere on the Gulf of La Spezia
- Reconstructed view of Athens
- Der Domplatz in Amalfi
- Panorama of Tivoli from a Loggia

== Architectural works ==
- In Munich (München):
  - Glyptothek (1816–1830)
  - Alte Pinakothek (1826–1836)
  - Residenz – Königsbau, Festsaalbau and the Allerheiligen-Hofkirche (1826–1842)
  - Monopteros temple in Englischer Garten (1836)
  - Propyläen Gate (1846–1862)
  - Ruhmeshalle (1850)
  - Monopteros in the park of Nymphenburg Palace
  - Ludwigstrasse, Odeonsplatz and adjacent Wittelsbacherplatz
  - Herzog-Max-Palais (1828–1831)
- Ballhouse in Wilhelmshöhe castle park, (Kassel) (1809–1810)
- Ismaning castle (1816) built for a stepson of Napoleon, Eugène de Beauharnais, and his spouse.
- Walhalla temple near Regensburg (1816–1842)
- Neues Schloss (New Palace) at Pappenheim (1819–1820)
- New Hermitage in Saint Petersburg, Russia (1839–1852)
- Catholic church of St. Dionysios the Areopagite in Athens, Greece (1853–1865)
- Befreiungshalle in Kelheim (1863)

== See also ==
- Neoclassical architecture
