= Clemens von Zimmermann =

German painter

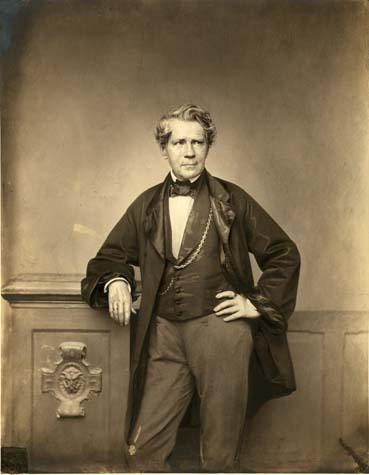
Clemens von Zimmermann

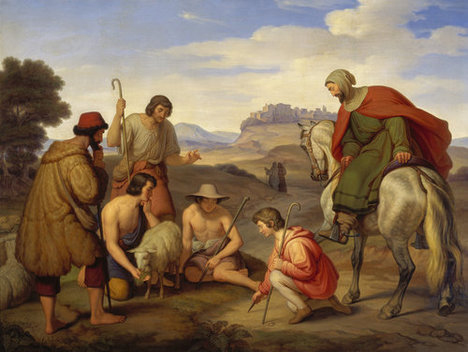
Cimabue and the Young Giotto

Clemens von Zimmermann (8 November 1788 – 25 January 1869) was a German historical painter. He is associated with the Düsseldorf school of painting.

== Biography ==
He was born in Düsseldorf. He studied in his native town under Johann Peter von Langer, and in 1808 he accompanied his master to Munich, where he entered the Academy. In 1815 he went to Augsburg, where he was appointed professor and director of the school of art. Ten years later he became professor at the Munich Academy.

He assisted Peter von Cornelius in his frescoes at the Glyptothek, and was also engaged on decorative work in the colonnades of the Hofgarten, in the corridor of the Alte Pinakothek, and in the dining-hall of the Residenz.

He died at Munich on 25 January 1869. The Neue Pinakothek contains two of his pictures: Cimabue finding Giotto sketching a Lamb and Pilgrims to Loretto from the Roman Campagna. He painted a large number of portraits, among them those of Queen Hortense and of King Max I of Bavaria, and etched and lithographed many views of Rome.
