= Medusa Rondanini =

Sculpture

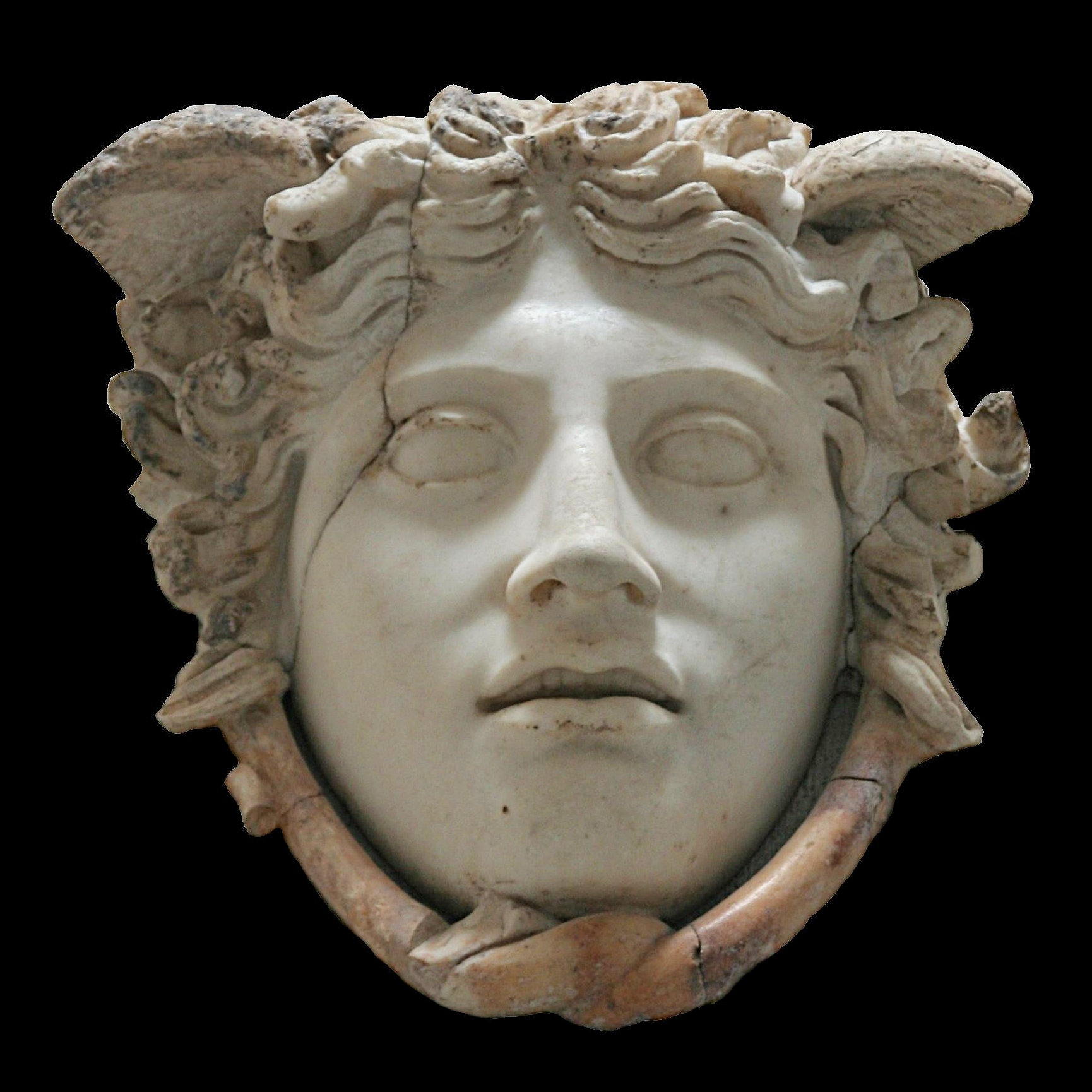
The Medusa Rondanini, marble (h. 0.29 m)

The over-lifesize Medusa Rondanini, the best late Hellenistic or Augustan Roman marble copy of the head of Medusa, is rendered more humanized and beautiful than the always grotesque apotropaic head of Medusa that appeared as the Gorgoneion on the aegis of Athena. The Medusa Rondanini is located in the Glyptothek in Munich, Germany, having been purchased by the art-loving king Ludwig I of Bavaria from the heirs of the marchese Rondanini, during his Grand Tour of Italy as a prince.

== History ==
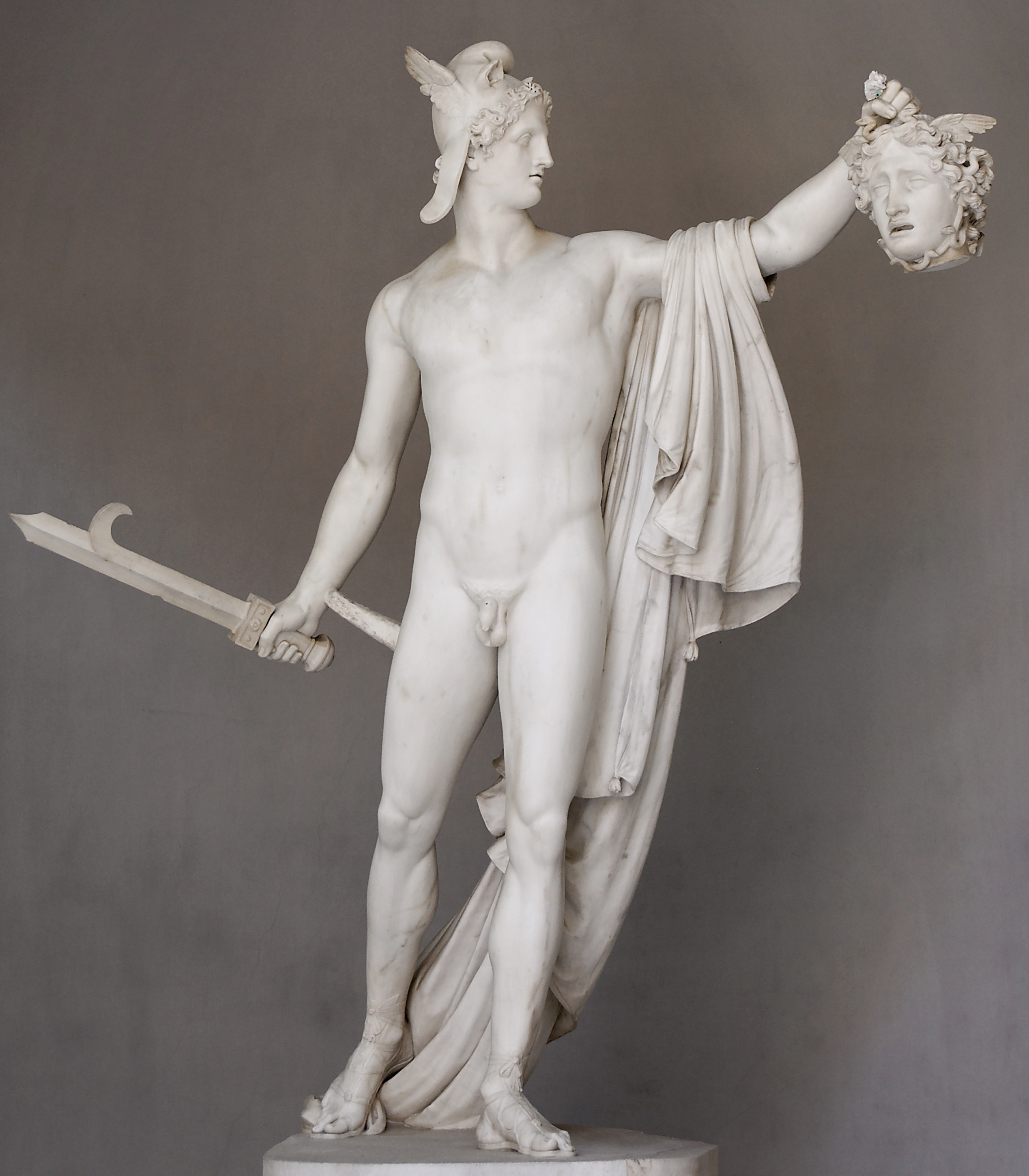
Perseus with the Head of Medusa, by Antonio Canova, 1798-1801 (Vatican Museums, Rome)

The Medusa Rondanini was formerly exhibited in Palazzo Rondanini in the upper end of via del Corso, Rome, where it was overlooked by the great art historian Johann Joachim Winckelmann, perhaps distracted by Michelangelo's Rondanini Pietà in the same collection. It was much admired, nevertheless, by Goethe, who was struck by its "unspeakable anguished stare of death" and said of it, when first bringing it to the attention of art historians in 1786, that "the mere knowledge that such a work could be created and still exists in the world makes me twice the person I was." When Antonio Canova made a marble Perseus with the Head of Medusa (1798-1801), to take the place of the Apollo Belvedere sent to Napoleonic Paris, it was the Medusa Rondanini that served as the model for the gorgon's head in Perseus' outstretched hand.

The Medusa Rondanini may be a Roman copy of a classical work of the fifth century BC, a model attributed to one or another Athenian sculptor of the age of Phidias. Alternatively, it may have been modeled after a classicising Hellenistic work of the late fourth century BC. If it is of the fifth century, Janer Danforth Belson has pointed out, it is the first of the "beautiful gorgoneion" type to appear in Greek art by more than a century, and unparalleled in any contemporaneous representation of the Medusa head. Martin Robertson, following Furtwängler's attribution to Phidias, remarked that it would be unlikely for the beautiful face of the Medusa to be juxtaposed with the beautiful face of the goddess, whose gorgoneion retained its fearful archaic appearance.

Janer Danforth Belson has made a case for its model to have been the gorgoneion on a gilt-bronze aegis that was an ex-voto of Antiochus IV and was hung on the south retaining wall of the Acropolis of Athens about 170 BC, where it was noted by Pausanias in the late second century AD.

Six other ancient replicas of the same prototype, apparently a bronze, have been recorded, none of them of this quality.
