= General German Industrial Exhibition =

German 19th century exhibition hall

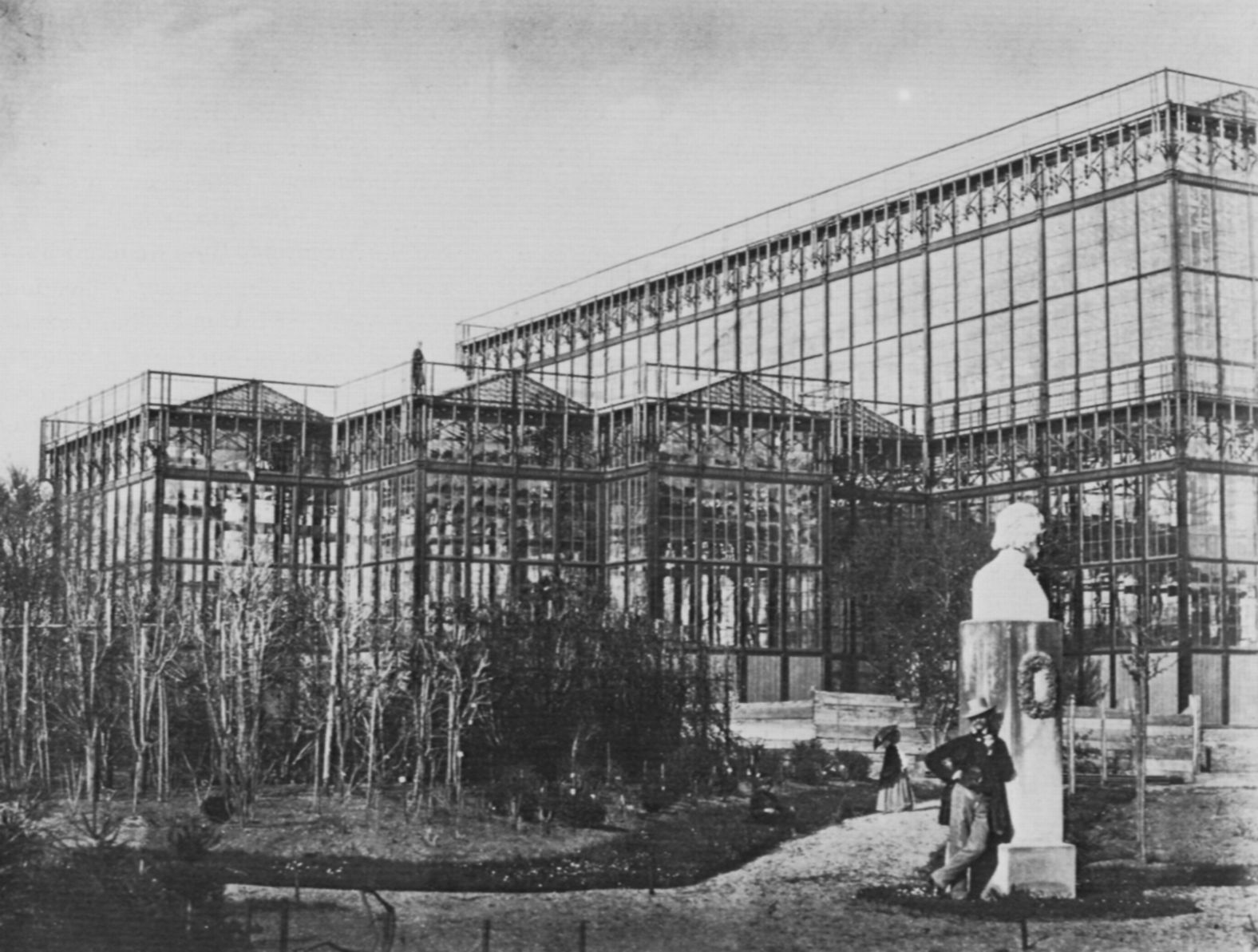

Overview
- BIE-class: Unrecognized exposition
- Name: General German Industrial Exhibition
- Building(s): Glaspalast
- Area: 15,670 square metres (1.567 ha)
- Visitors: 90,000 on first day
- Organized by: Maximilian II, King of Bavaria (organiser), August von Voit (venue designer)

Location
- Country: Kingdom of Bavaria
- City: Munich
- Coordinates: 48°08′32″N 11°33′53″E

Timeline
- Opening: 15 July 1854
- Closure: 15 October 1854

The General German Industrial Exhibition was designed to demonstrate German industry to a global audience, but was adversely impacted by a cholera epidemic associated with the 1846–1860 cholera pandemic.

It ran from 15 July 1854 until 15 October. There more than 5,000 visitors a day with more than 90,000 visitors on the first day.

== Building ==
The building, the Glaspalast, followed the architecture of The Crystal Palace three years earlier in London. It was made of glass and cast iron, over two levels inspired. It had two stories and over 234 by 67 m (768 by 220 ft) of floor area, and was 25 m (82 ft) tall.

== Cholera ==
There had been global cases of cholera (the third cholera pandemic) before the festival, but the risk of it was downplayed and the exhibition and a concurrent festival still took place. By August the epidemic hit Munich, 3,000 people eventually died of cholera and some contracting it at the exhibition including a woman from Thaining visiting Munich to see the exhibit.

== Medals ==
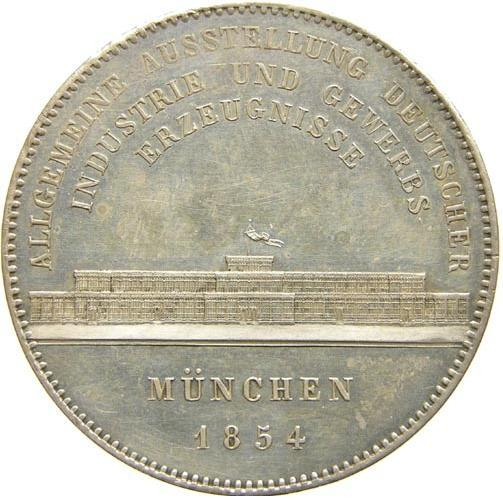
Industrieausstellung München 1854 Gedenkmünze König Maximilian II Bayern

The medals showed Maximilian II on the obverse and the Glaspalast on reverse. They were designed by Carl Friedrich Voigt.

== Legacy ==
The Glaspalast had been intended to be used as a botanic garden, but was used for exhibitions which helped establish Munich's reputation, until it burned in 1931. The fountain was moved to the Haidhausen quarter.
