= Miesbach–Munich Power Transmission =

First long-distance transmission of direct current

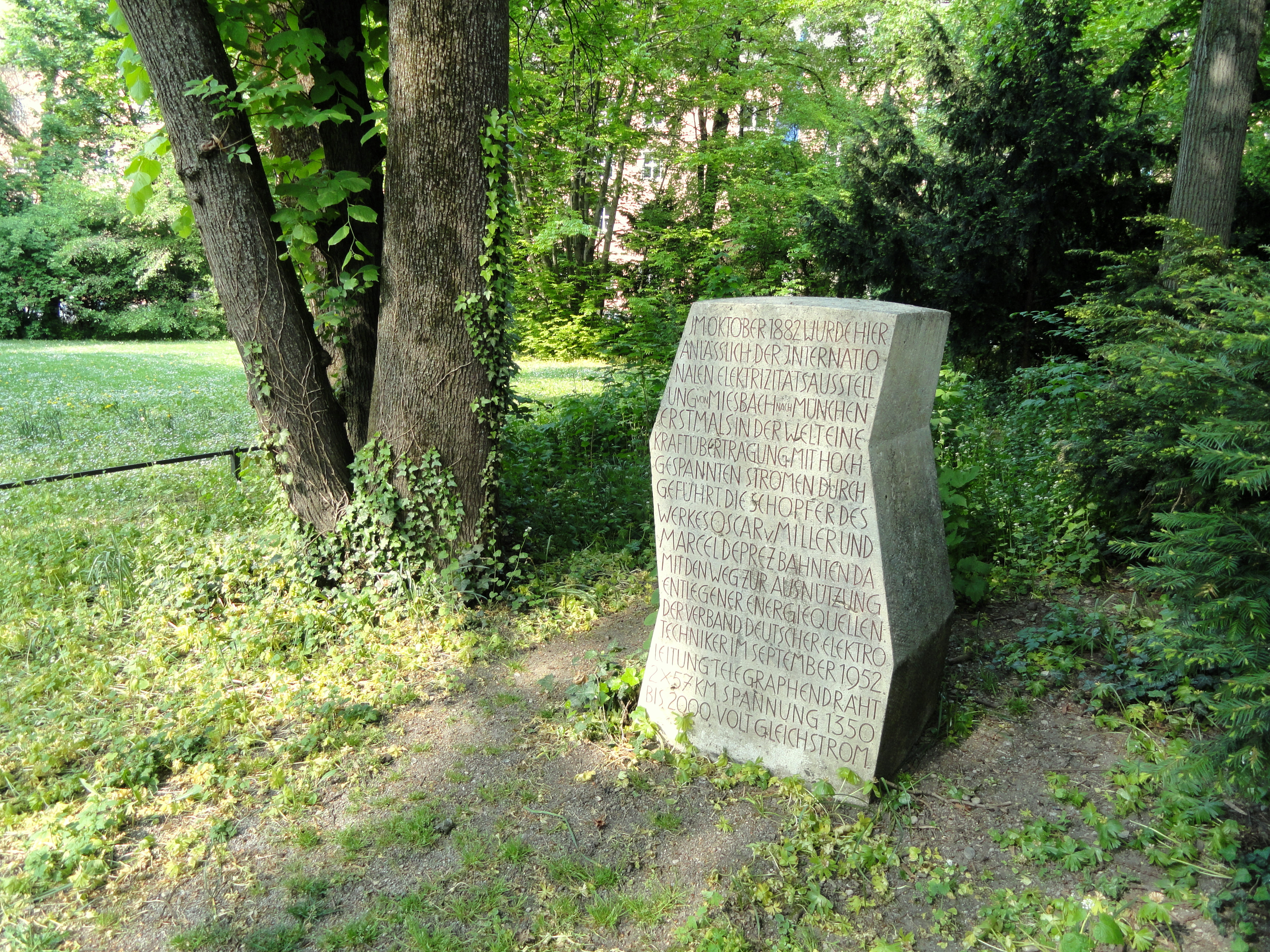
Monument to Miesbach–Munich Power Transmission, in the Alter Botanischer Garten (Munich)

Miesbach–Munich Power Transmission of 1882 was the first transmission of direct current (DC) electrical energy over a large distance (57 km).

After the first International Exposition of Electricity was held in Paris in 1881, the German Empire set up a power transmission between a steam engine situated near Miesbach and the glass palace of Munich, where an electricity exhibition opened on September 16, 1882. The voltage used was 2000 V direct current, and the distance 57 kilometres. Only 2.5 kilowatts of power (about 1.25 Ampere) was transmitted, which was used to run an artificial waterfall. The system was designed by Oskar von Miller and Marcel Deprez. A simple iron telegraph wire was used, which failed a few days later.

In later years, Deprez set up a 112 km long DC transmission in France between Creil and Paris, using 6 kV.

On August 25, 1891, the Lauffen-Frankfurt Three Phase AC Transmission over 175 km became part of the International Electrotechnical Exhibition in Germany, setting an end to the war of the currents.

== See also ==
- High-voltage direct current
