= Glaspalast (Munich) =

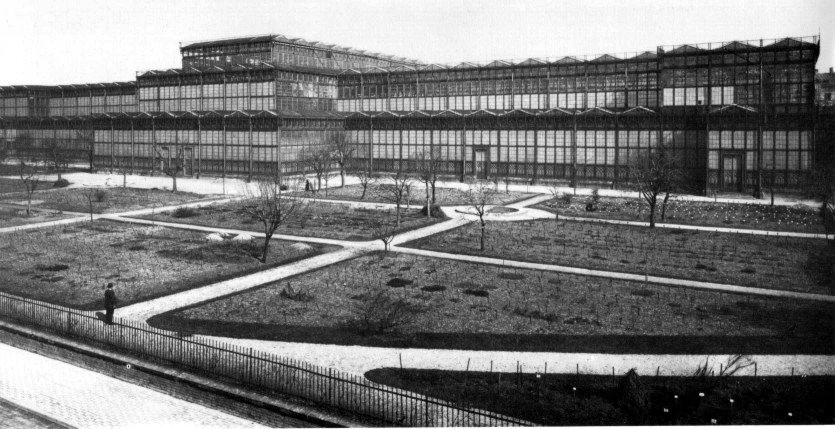
- The Glaspalast in Munich

General information
- Status: Destroyed
- Type: Exhibition palace
- Location: Munich, Germany
- Coordinates: 48°08′32″N 11°33′53″E
- Construction started: 31 December 1853
- Completed: 7 June 1854
- Destroyed: 6 June 1931
- Cost: 800,000 guldens

Design and construction
- Architect: August von Voit

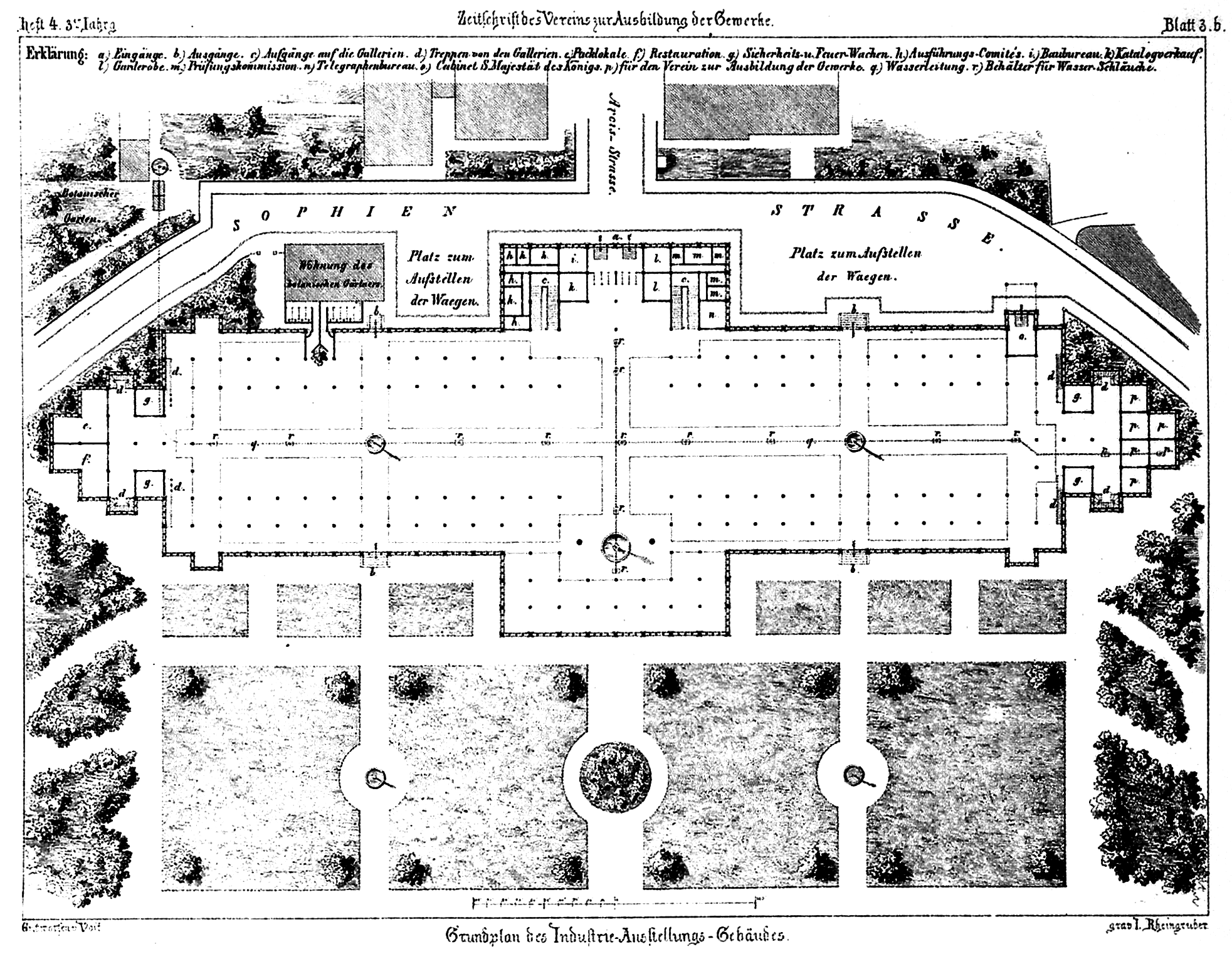
Ground plan 1854

The Glaspalast (Glass Palace) was a glass and iron exhibition building located in the Old botanical garden in Munich modeled after the Crystal Palace in London. The Glaspalast opened for the first General German Industrial Exhibition on 15 July 1854. It was destroyed by arson in 1931.

== Planning ==
Following other examples around Europe, the Glaspalast was ordered by Maximilian II, King of Bavaria, in order to hold the Erste Allgemeine Deutsche Industrieausstellung (First General German Industrial Exhibition) on 15 July 1854.

Originally it was planned to erect the building on Maximiliansplatz. However, the relevant Commission decision preferred an area near the railway station. Designed by architect August von Voit and built by MAN AG, the building was built in 1854 to the north of the Old Botanical Garden close to the Stachus.

== Construction ==
Following the completion of 1853 Schrannenhalle and the planned and conservatory of Munich Residence, a glass with cast iron design was used, using existing experience for this modern building.

As with the Crystal Palace in London, initial designs were relatively complex. Due to the short time available for construction, the design was significantly simplified and relied on use of standard components. Conventional construction methods were not possible due to the large amount of building materials required.

The two-storey building was 234 metres (768 ft) long, 67 metres (220 ft) wide and 25 metres (82 ft) high. The elongated rectangular glass palace, in the form of a five-nave and two-storey main building in the hall with a transept in the middle and rectangular extensions at the ends of the longitudinal ship had a length of 234 meters and was 67 meters wide; the height was 25 meters.

The building was built entirely of glass and cast iron, load-bearing walls were completely omitted. The 1,700 tons of prefabricated iron parts were made by Cramer-Klett in Nuremberg. The company Cramer-Klett was the leader at this time in southern Germany in the field of iron constructions, the company had previously built the Großhesseloher bridge in Munich and also the Maximilian II conservatory. For this construction, the glass was produced in the more traditional Schmidsfelden glass works.

Construction was a mere six months, from 31 December 1853 to 7 June 1854, during which time 37,000 windows were installed. The total cost of construction was 800,000 guldens.

The Erste Allgemeine Deutsche Industrieausstellung opened five weeks later, only three years after the completion of the Crystal Palace in London, which served as its model.

== Uses ==
=== First General German industry exhibition ===
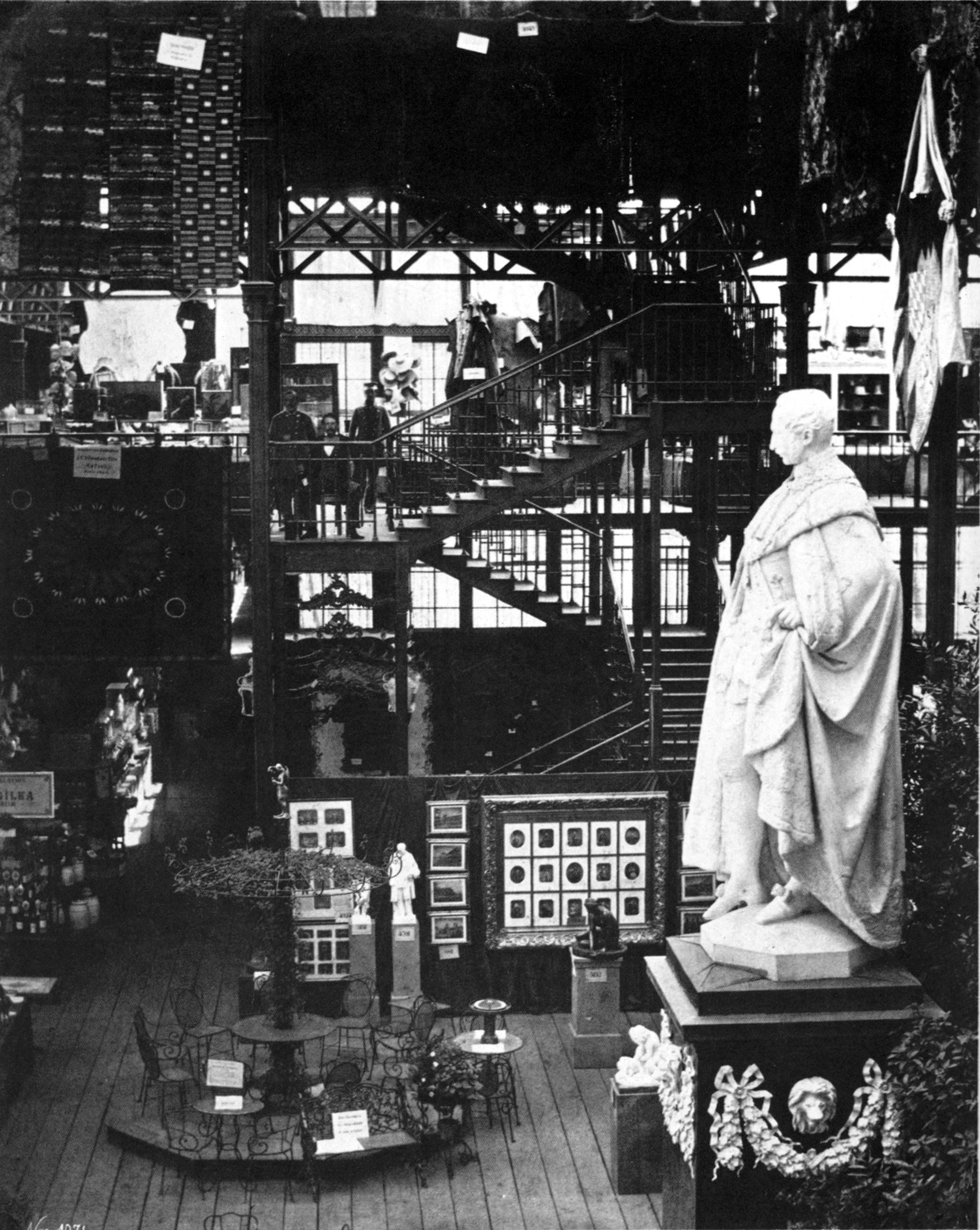
Glaspalast with German Industry exhibition, 1854

Just three years after the completion of the Crystal Palace in London, which served as a model, the First General German Industrial Exhibition opened at the newly built glass palace on 15 July 1854. However the opening was overshadowed as first the staff and later the exhibition guests were affected by cholera.

=== Electrification ===
In 1882 the first electrically lit international electrotechnical exhibition took place in the Glass Palace. The German engineer Oskar von Miller had built a 2000 volt DC overhead power line from Miesbach, 50 km distant, to bring power to Munich. At the exhibition, an electrically powered pump for an artificial waterfall demonstrated the feasibility of bringing electrical power over long distances.

=== The Glass Palace as a venue of art exhibitions ===
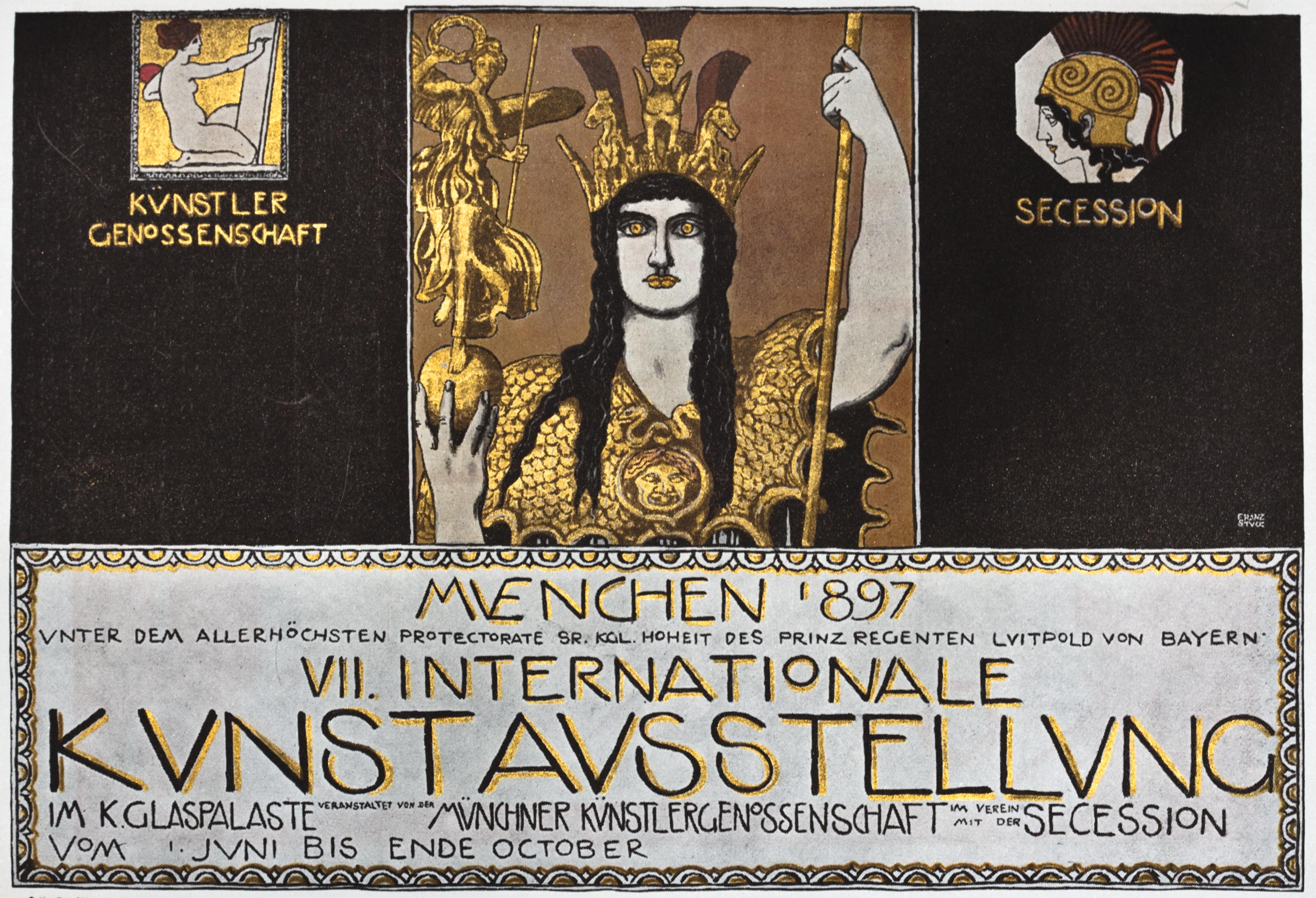
Poster for the VII. International Art Exhibition in Munich, by Franz von Stuck in 1897

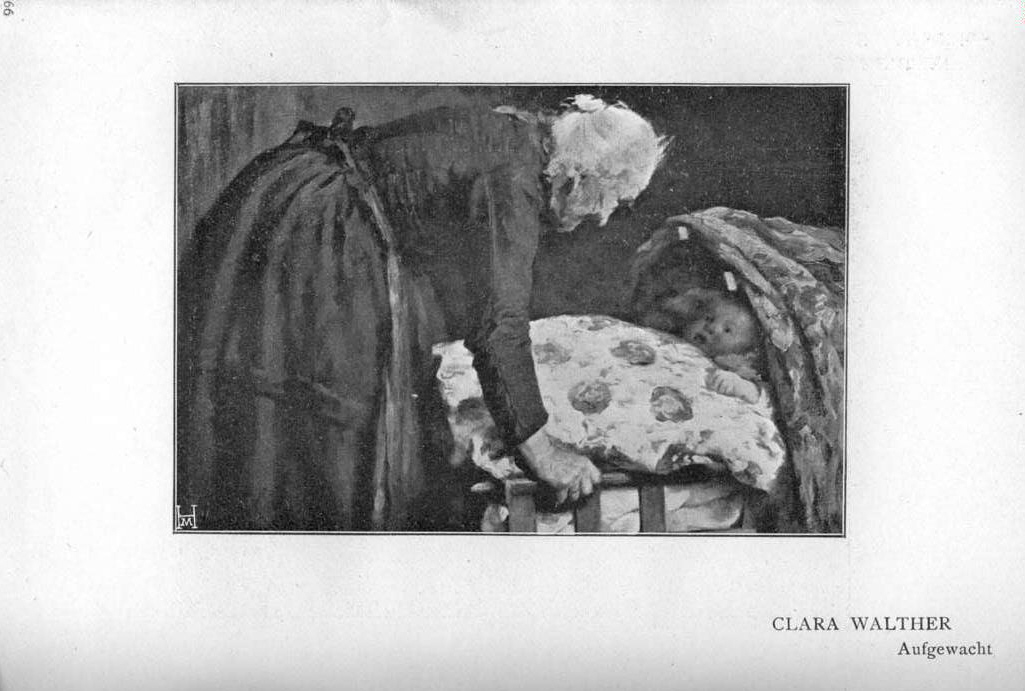
Awakened by Clara Walther, Official catalogue of the 8th International Exhibition in 1901

In 1858, the "First German general and historical art exhibition" organized in the palace, followed in 1869 by the "I. International Art Exhibition", 1888 "III. International Art Exhibition".

From 1889, the Crystal Palace was almost exclusively used for art exhibitions. This affected the forum and place of the international art trade.

=== Other uses ===
When it was planned, following the industrial exhibition, it was assumed that the Glaspalast would be used as a greenhouse. However it was almost exclusively used for international art exhibitions and artist festivals.

== Fire ==
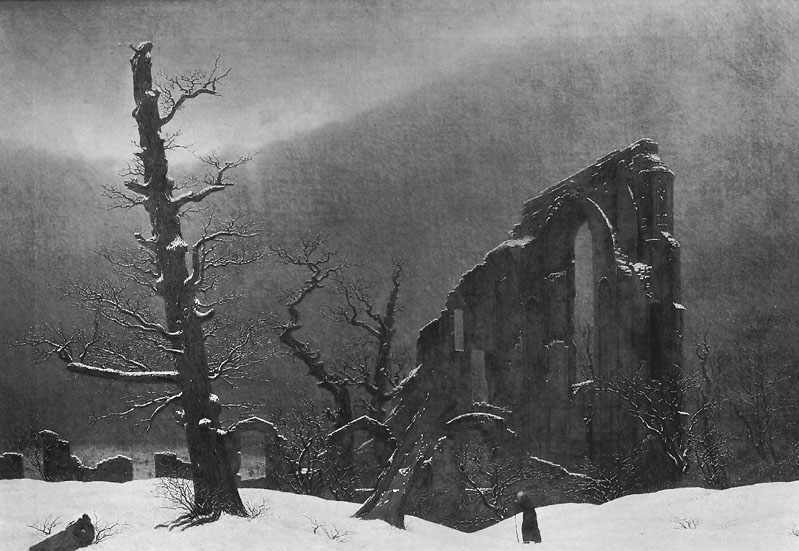
Winter Landscape with Church (1807–08). This oil painting by Caspar David Friedrich was among the works destroyed in the fire.

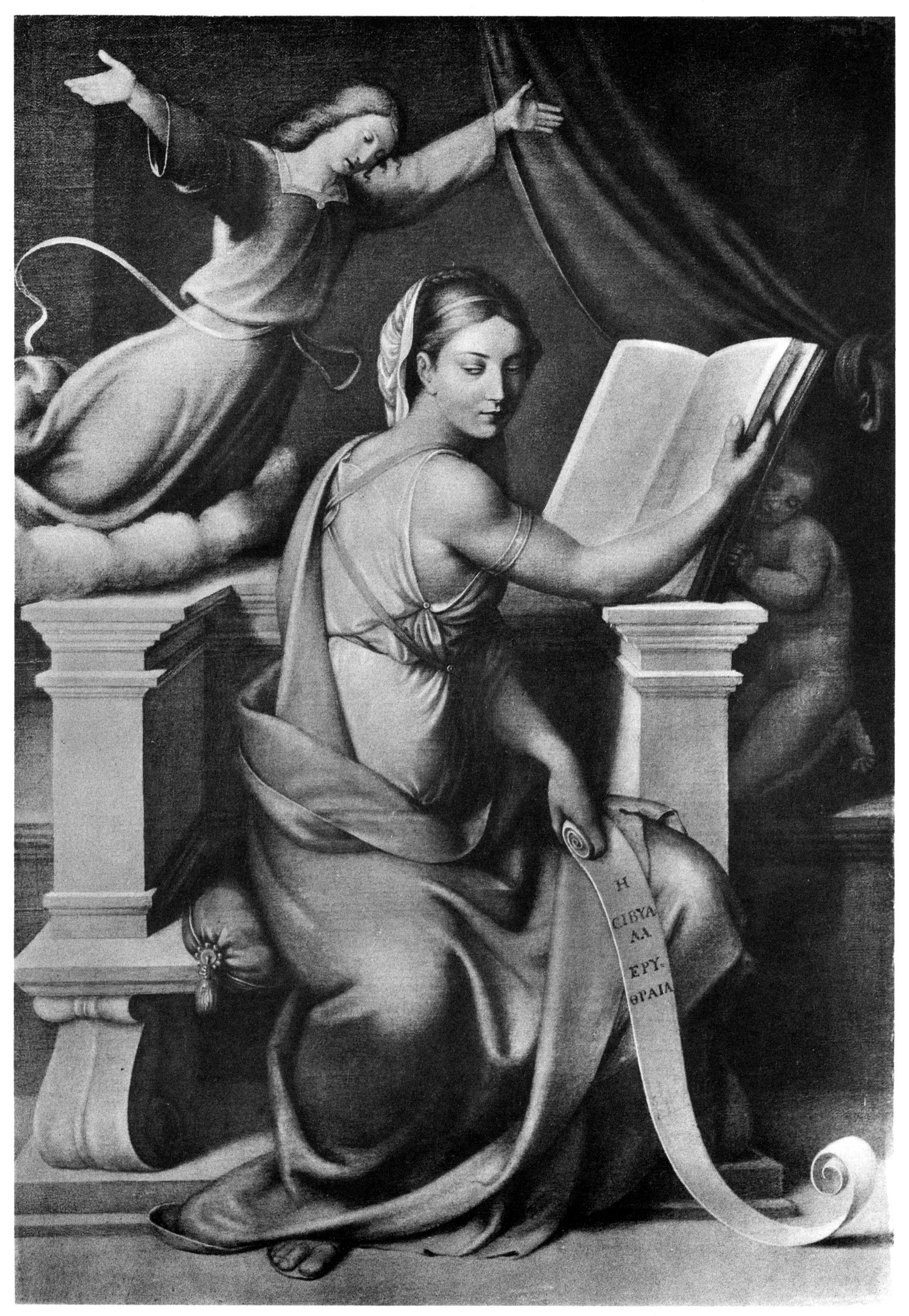
Painting by Friedrich Overbeck destroyed in the fire

The building was destroyed in a fire on June 6, 1931, a fate shared with the other crystal palaces. The cause of the fire was later determined to be arson. The fire in the Glaspalast irretrievably destroyed more than 3,000 artworks including more than 110 paintings from the early 19th century including many paintings by Caspar David Friedrich, Moritz von Schwind, Karl Blechen, and Philipp Otto Runge. A further 1,000 works by contemporary artists at that time were heavily damaged and only 80 artworks were recovered unharmed.

The daily newspaper Neues Wiener Tagblatt reported on the following day, June 7, 1931, in a telegram: The fire of the Munich Glass Palace, S. 4:

The fire of the Glass Palace is one of the biggest destructive disasters to Europe's art. In Germany since the Thirty Years' War were never at one time so many works of art destroyed as by this fire. Only 80 of the 2820 exhibited works of painting, graphics and sculpture were rescued. The damage is estimated to be between 25 and 30 million Marks. [...] A special tragicomedy was the fact that the pictures rejected by the jury were stored in an adjacent shed not affected by the fire. About the cause of the fire only assumptions are known. Provisional Rumor of a discontented artistic revenge, but which cannot be confirmed. The initial investigations show that the fire may have broken out in the carpentry shop, where work continued on the day. 20 firefighters were injured in the rescue work. Director-General Zimmermann, who risked his life to save treasures from the 75 completely burned halls, had first to be forcibly restrained by police. A meeting at the Ministry of Culture, which ended in the afternoon, has decided to immediately initiate a relief by a public appeal to the German people on the occasion of national calamity ...

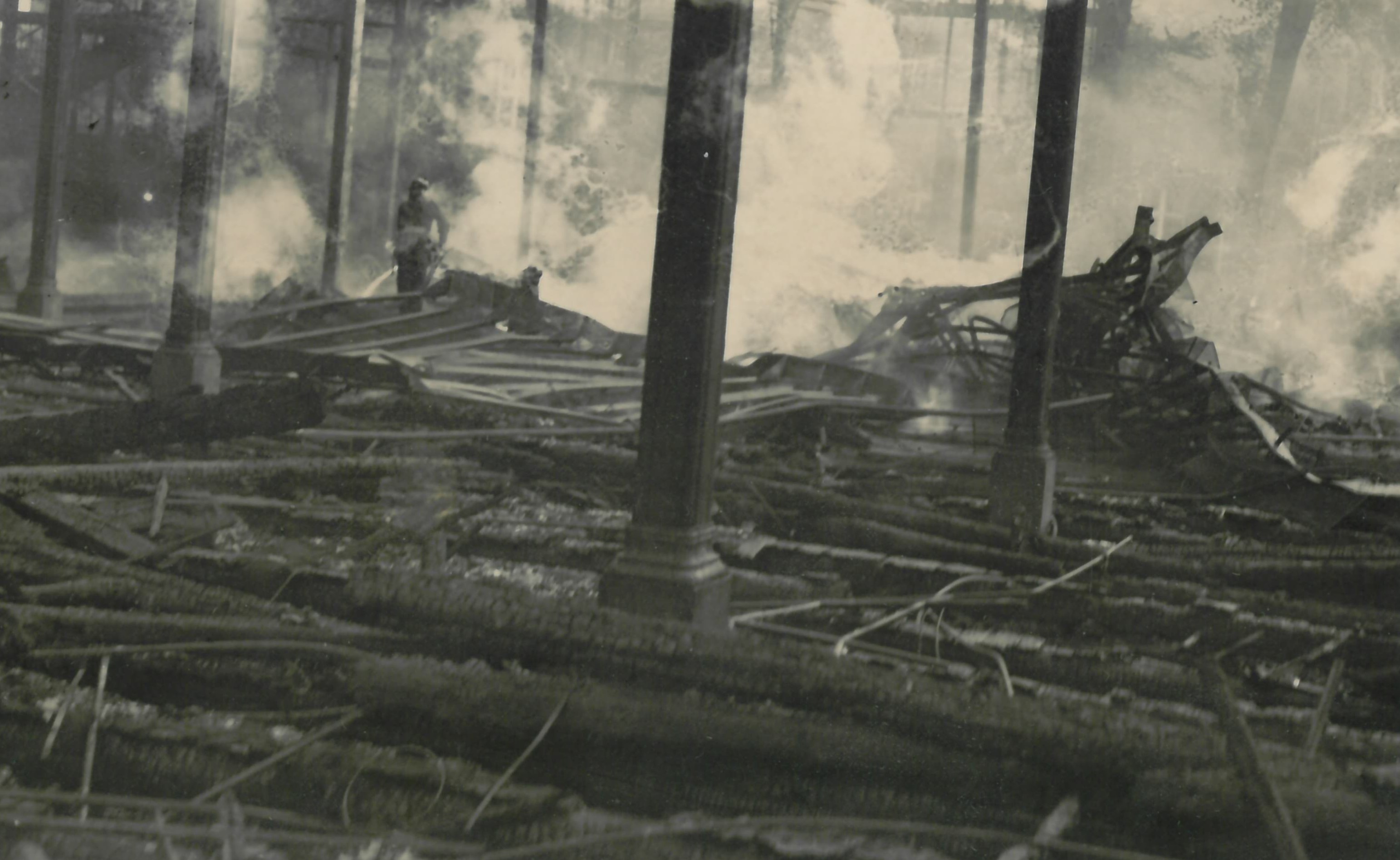
Glass Palace Munich ruins and fire extinguishing. Photograph by Prof. Georg Hensinger, by then director of the Glaspalast Exhibitions.

== Other ==
After the fire, plans were made to rebuild the Glaspalast. However, the plans were abandoned in 1933 after seizure of power by the new Nazi government. Instead of rebuilding the palace, the government built the Haus der Kunst (House of Art) on the Prinzregentenstraße near the Englischer Garten (a public park).

In 1936 a small exhibition pavilion was built, but was destroyed in World War II. This was rebuilt by artists after the war.

The Park Cafe now stands on the site of the Glaspalast.

The fountain of the Glaspalast, which remained intact, today stands in the center of the Weißenburger Platz in the Haidhausen quarter of Munich.
