= August von Voit =

German architect

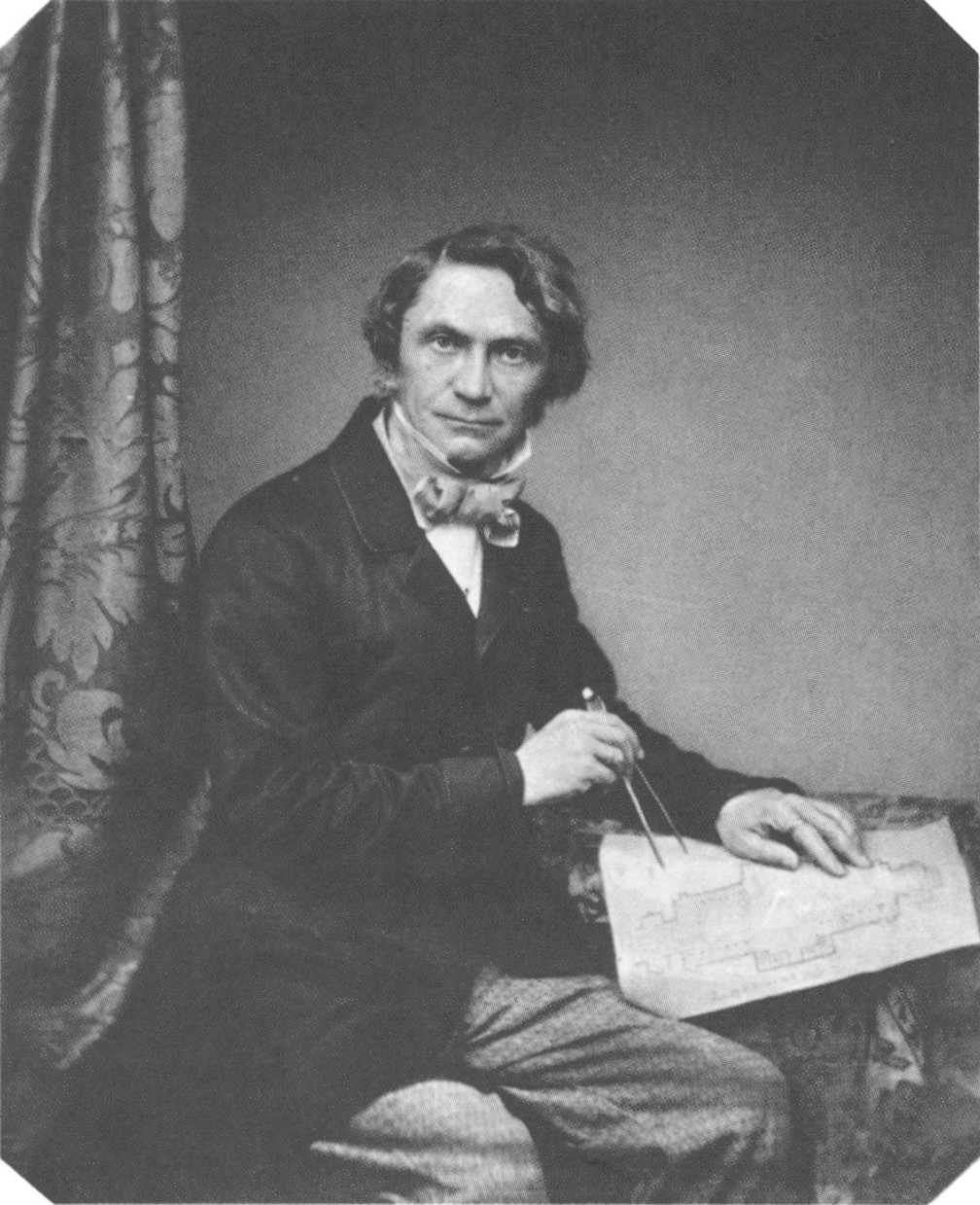
- Born: Richard Jakob August von Voit; February 17, 1801; Wassertrüdingen, Germany
- Died: December 12, 1870 (aged 69); Munich, Germany
- Occupation: Architect

Richard Jakob August von Voit (17 February 1801 – 12 December 1870) was a German architect specializing in glass and iron structures.

== Notable projects ==
Voit designed the city hall of Annweiler am Trifels (Rhineland-Palatinate) and the Fruchthalle (Kaiserslautern) in Rhineland-Palatinate. He also designed two synagogues, one in Kirchheimbolanden in 1834, and another in Speyer in 1837. Von Voit also created the neo-Romanesque facade on St. Anna's, Lehel, which was destroyed during the war.

=== 1846–1853 – Neue Pinakothek ===
The Neue Pinakothek Art Museum was commissioned by Ludwig I of Bavaria and designed by Von Voit and Friedrich von Gärtner. The design of the structure was calculated to reinforce the similarity between the older and newer museums. As part of the design, Von Voit commissioned Wilhelm von Kaulbach to show the achievements of German art in mural form.

The building as originally designed was demolished in 1950 and rebuilt in 1967.

=== 1853–1854 – Glaspalast, Munich ===
August von Voit, as the Royal Superintendent of Works, assisted in organizing the construction of the Glass Palace at Munich as well as being the architect. In order to ensure the project was completed on schedule, von Voit negotiated a contract with the manufacturers which had an increasing penalty rate for the late supply of goods. The design "used rectangular girders as the elements of the space frame". The Glaspalast was modeled after the London Crystal Palace.

=== 1860–1865 – Great Palm House, Old Botanical Gardens, Munich ===
This project was built in the form of a "cast-iron space frame with dome".

=== 1867–1869 – Second Large Winter Garden ===
The Second Large Winter Garden was commissioned by Ludwig II of Bavaria. Von Voit collaborated on the project with Carl von Effner to create a "glass-roofed, three-story structure" which faced both the palace gardens and the Kaiserhof.

== Criticisms ==
The glass and iron style were criticized for an apparent "lack of substance and corporeality", and the iron used in the construction of buildings such as the Glaspalast "proved too brittle and too prone to fire".

== Gallery ==
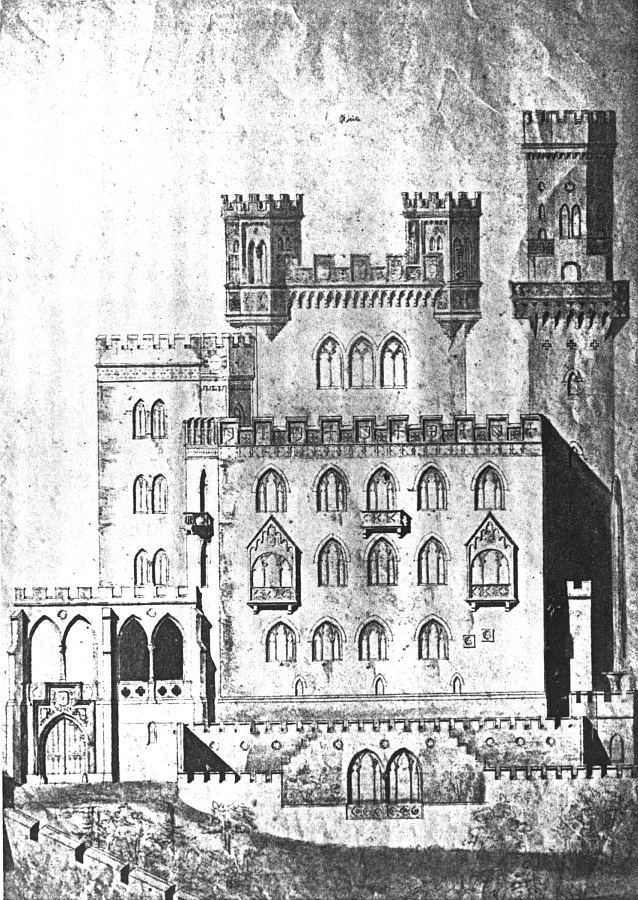
Hambacher Schloss

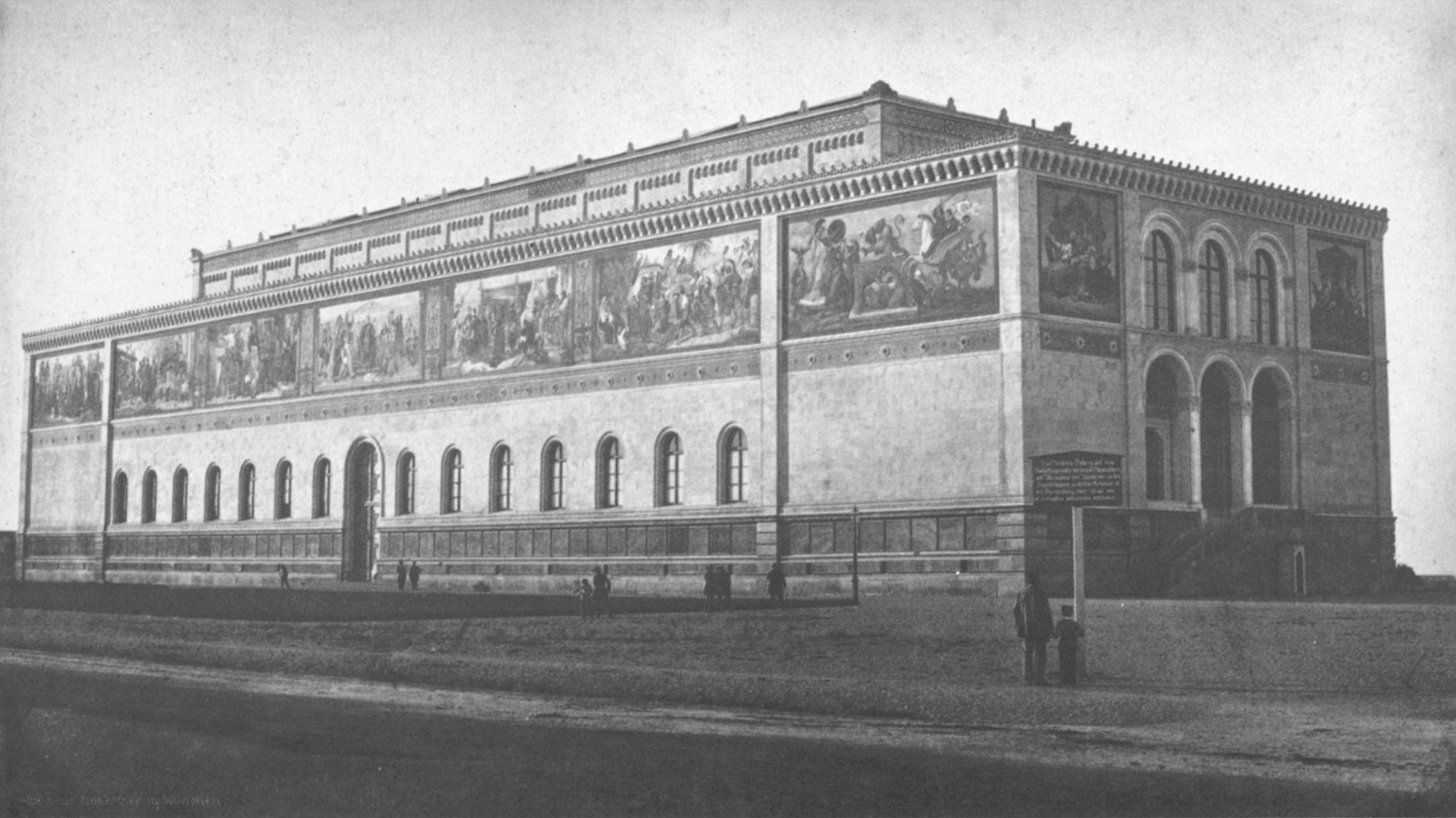
Neue Pinakothek
