= Alter Botanischer Garten (Munich) =

Park in Munich, Germany

Old Botanical Garden
- Alter Botanischer Garten
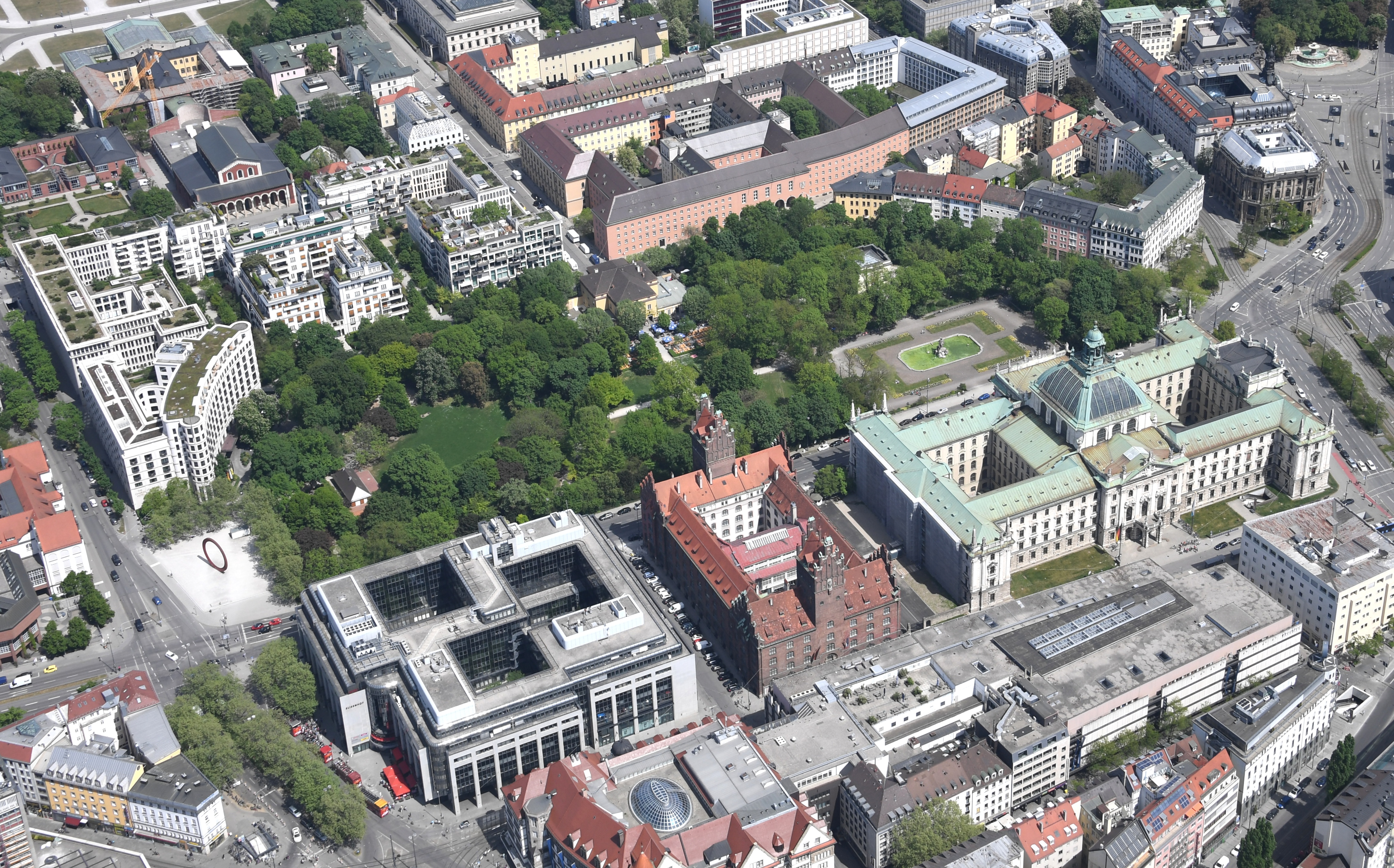
- Aerial view of the Alter Botanischer Garten
- Interactive map of Old Botanical Garden
- Type: Urban park
- Location: Munich, Germany
- Coordinates: 48°08′30″N 11°33′51″E

The Old Botanical Garden (German: Alter Botanischer Garten) is an urban park and former botanical garden in Maxvorstadt, Munich, Germany.

== Description ==
The Old Botanical Garden is located in Maxvorstadt, 450 m (0.3 mi) from the Karlsplatz and 800 m (0.5 mi) from the Alte Pinakothek. The site occupies an area of about four hectares.

The park was created between 1804 and 1812 according to plans by landscape architect Friedrich Ludwig von Sckell. It officially opened on 23 May 1812. The landmark Neoclassical entrance portal at Lenbachplatz was designed by the Portuguese architect Emanuel Joseph d'Herigoyen and built in 1812.

In 1854, the Glass Palace was built on the north side of the park, but was destroyed by fire in 1931. During the winter seasons of 1931/32 and 1932/33, an ice rink was built in place of the glass palace where the final round of the 1933 German Ice Hockey Championship was held.

In 1914, the New Botanical Garden in Nymphenburg was built. Subsequently, in 1937, the old botanical garden was turned into a park based on a sketch by Paul Troost and plans from architect Oswald Bieber and sculptor Joseph Wackerle. Additions included the Neptune Fountain in the middle of the park and a café. The Kunstpavillon, a small exhibition building, was also built, but was badly damaged in World War II and later rebuilt by volunteer Munich artists. Today the pavilion is used for contemporary art exhibitions.

== Photos ==
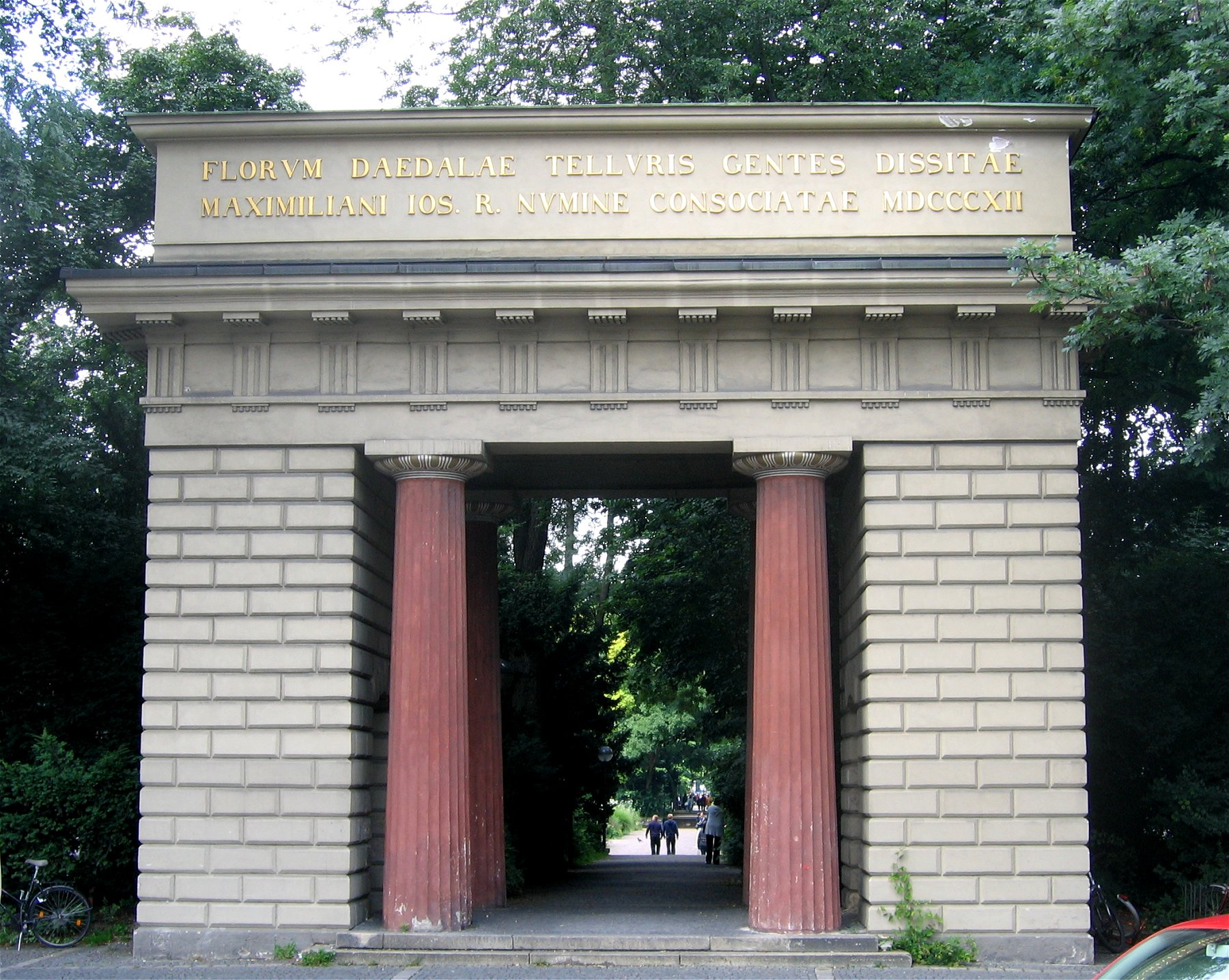
Entrance portal

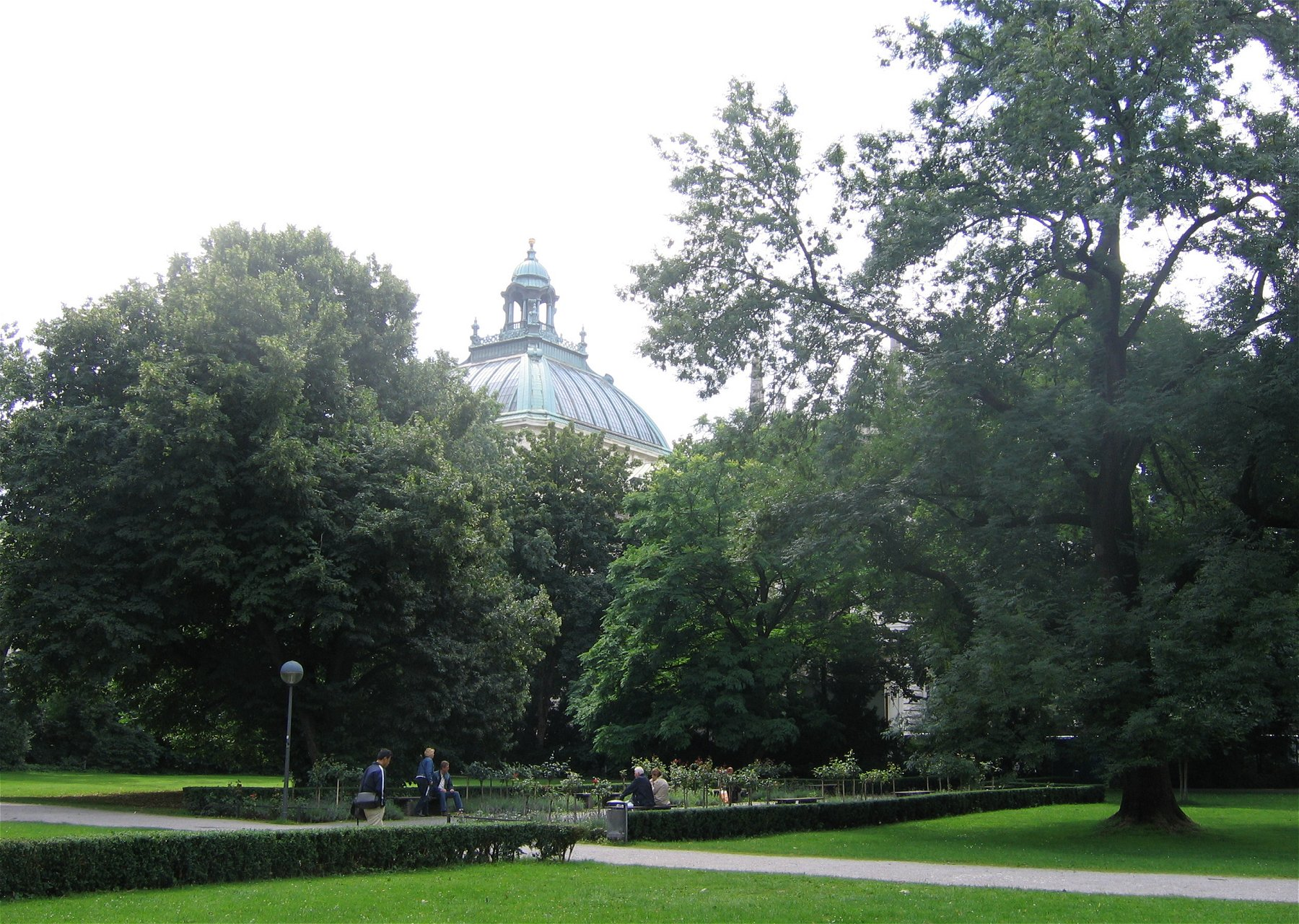
Old botanical garden

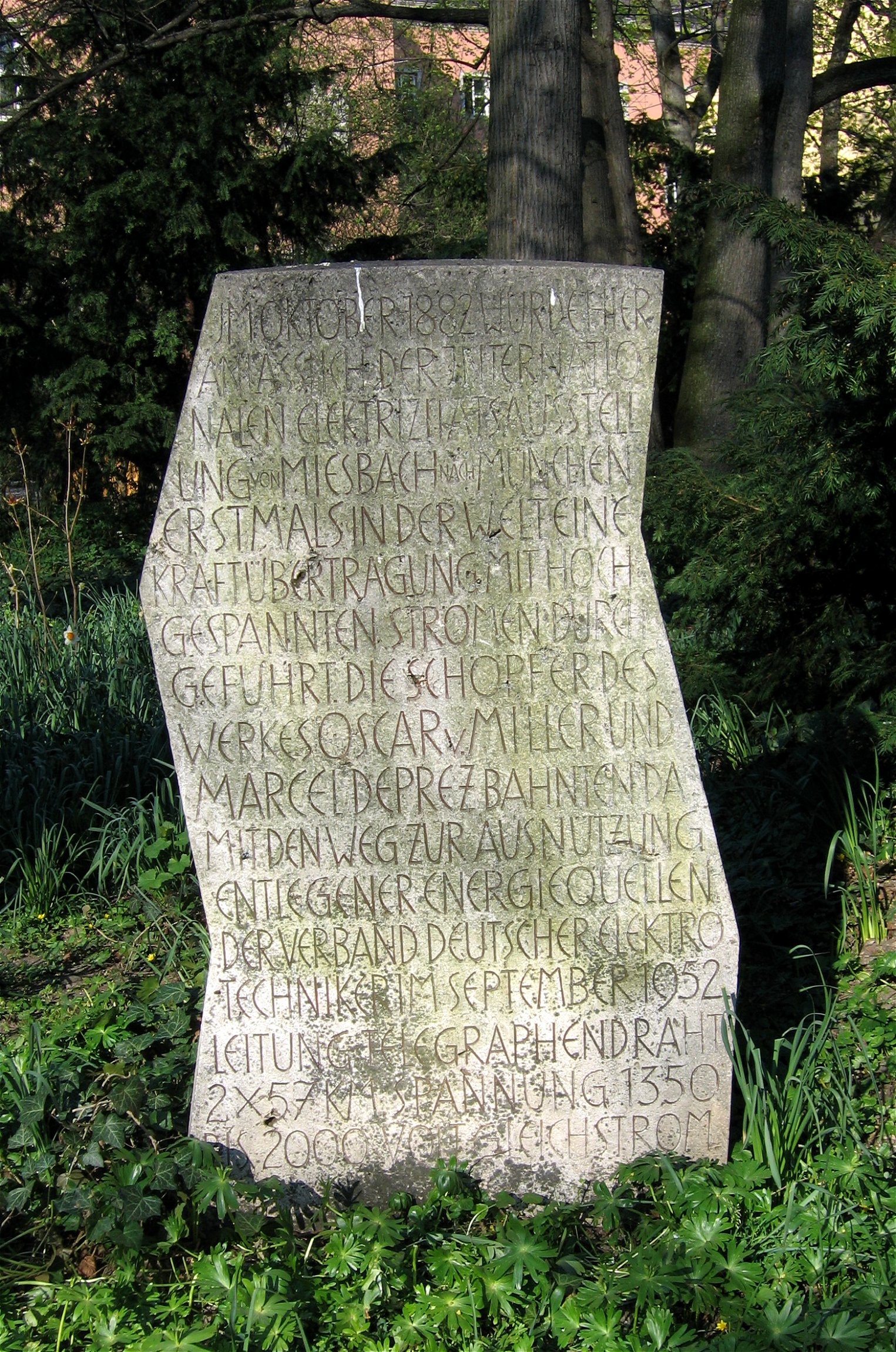
Memorial to the world's first long distance power transmission, Miesbach–Munich 2000V DC Power Transmission in 1882

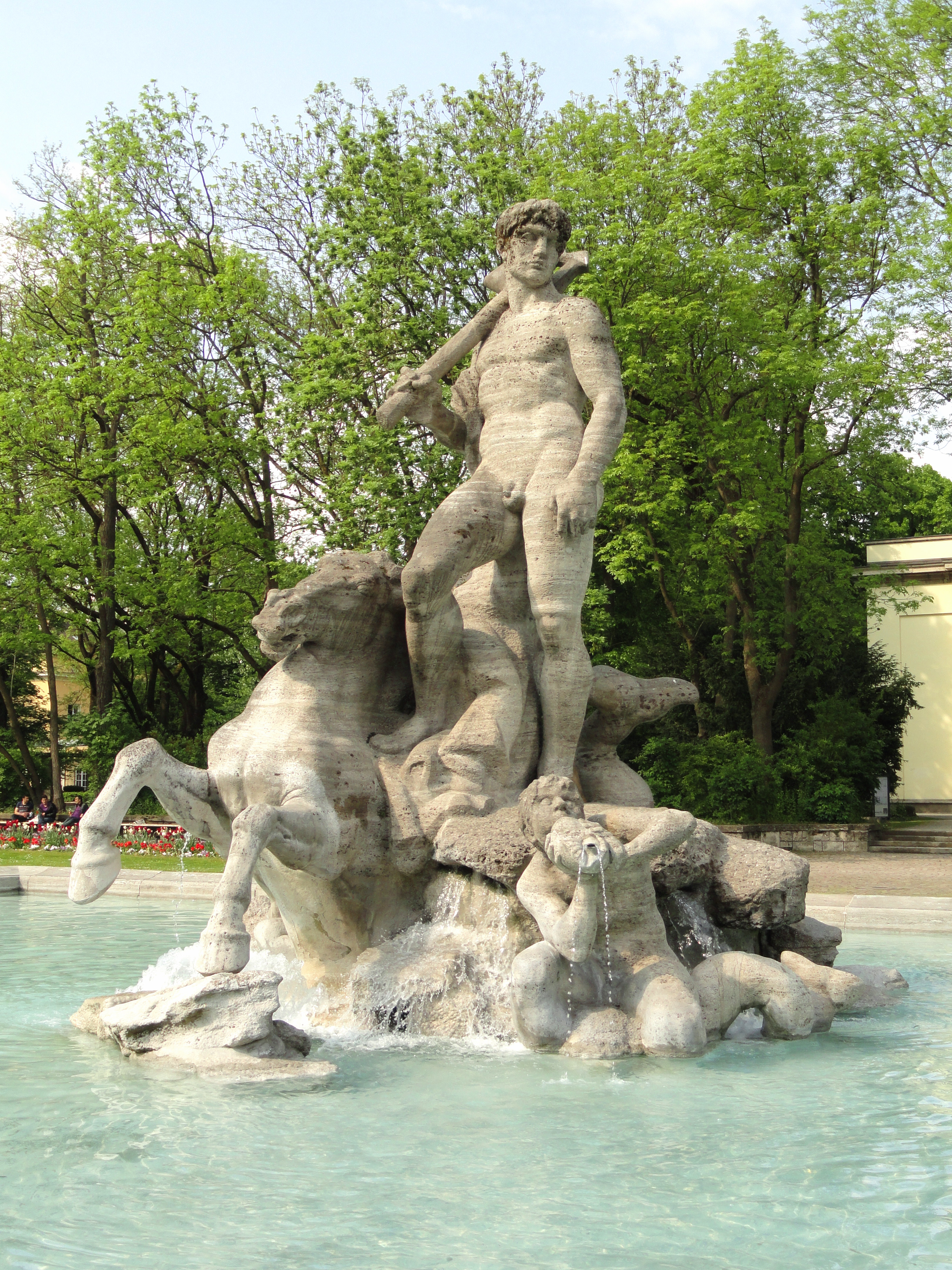
Neptune's fountain
