= Botanical Garden Munich-Nymphenburg =

Botanical garden and arboretum in Munich

- Botanischer Garten München-Nymphenburg
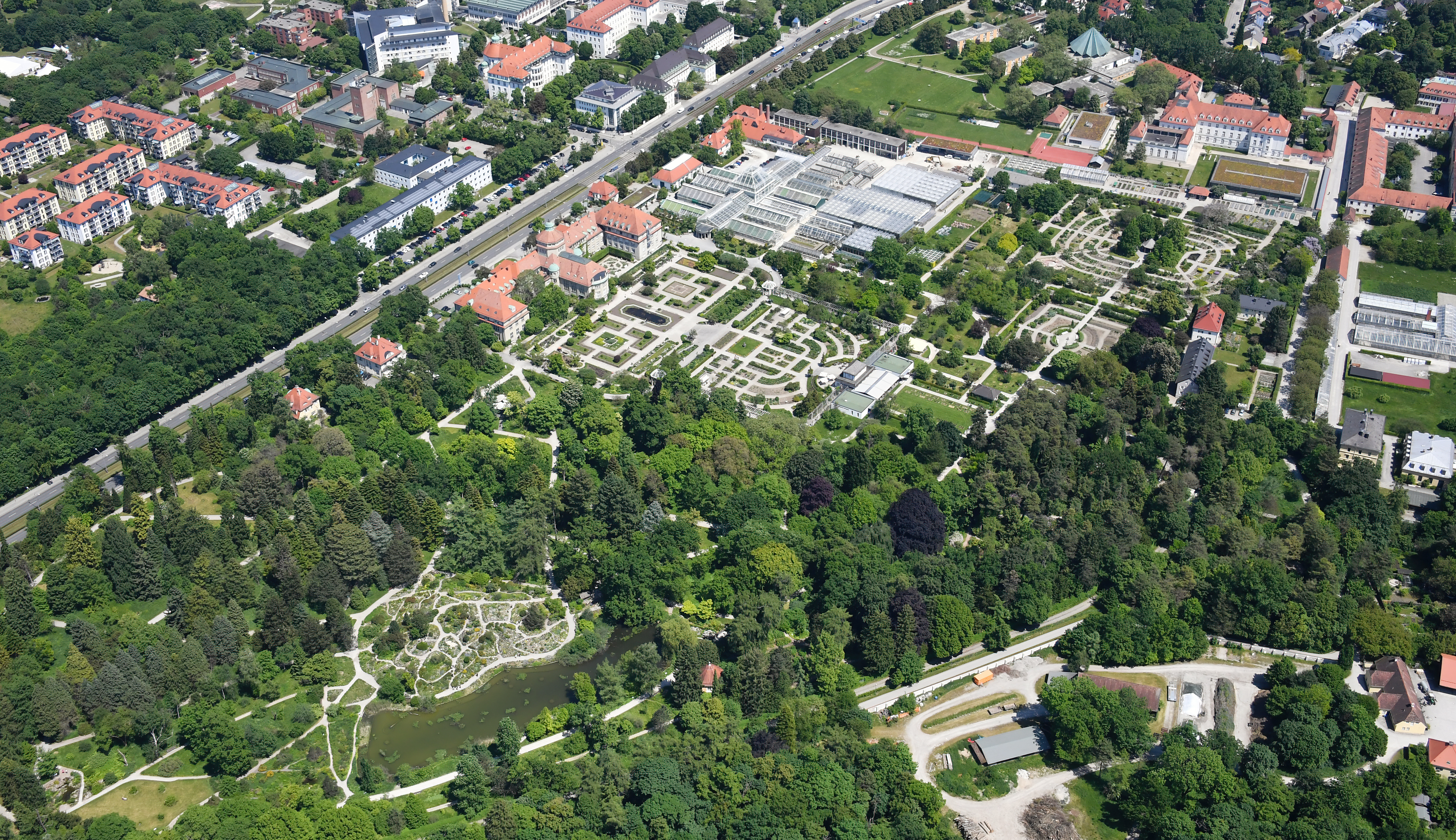
- Aerial view of the Botanischer Garten München-Nymphenburg
- Interactive map of Botanical Garden Munich-Nymphenburg
- Type: Botanical garden; arboretum
- Location: Menzinger Straße 65; Munich, Germany
- Coordinates: 48.1633°N 11.5005°E

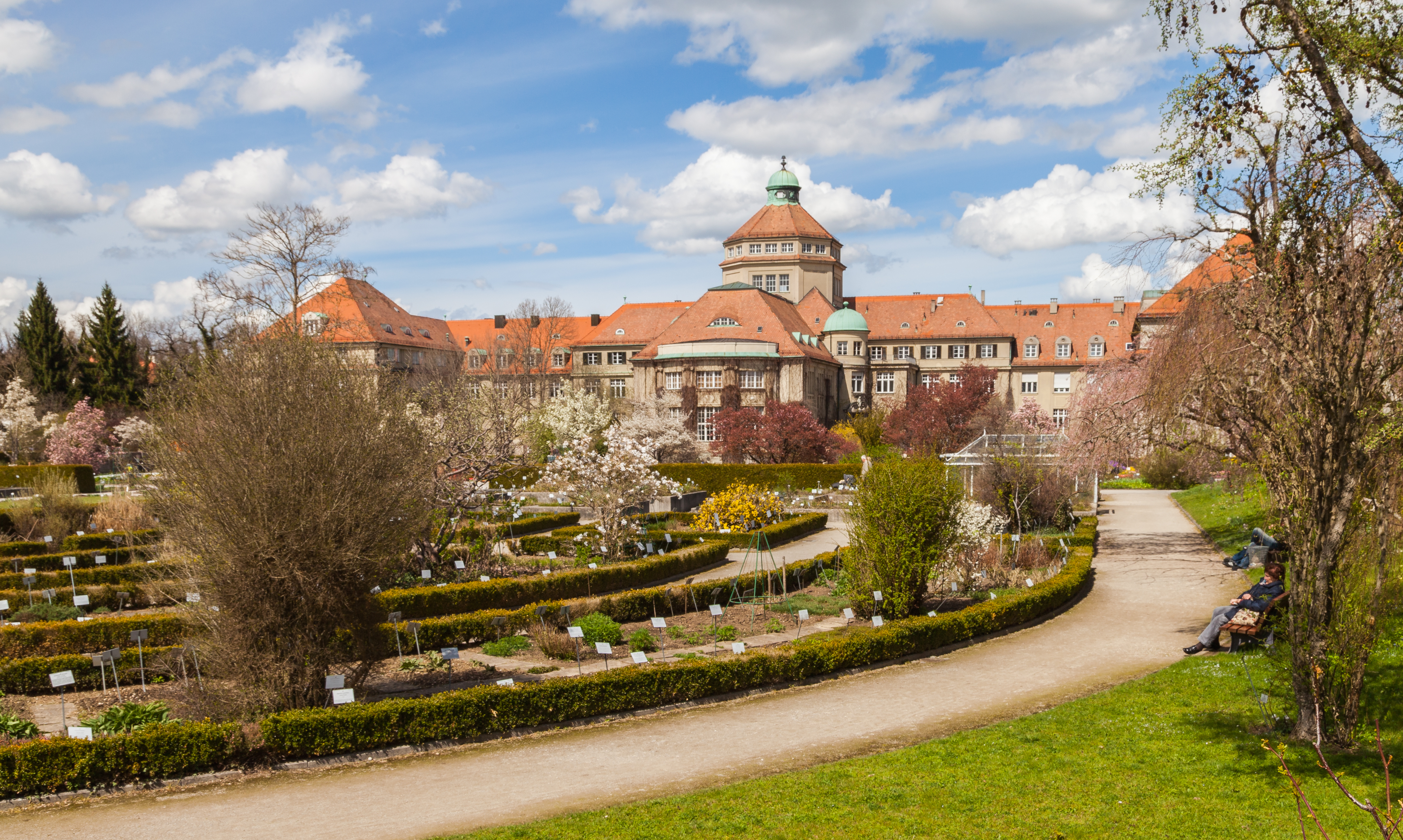
Munich Botanical Institute, April 2012

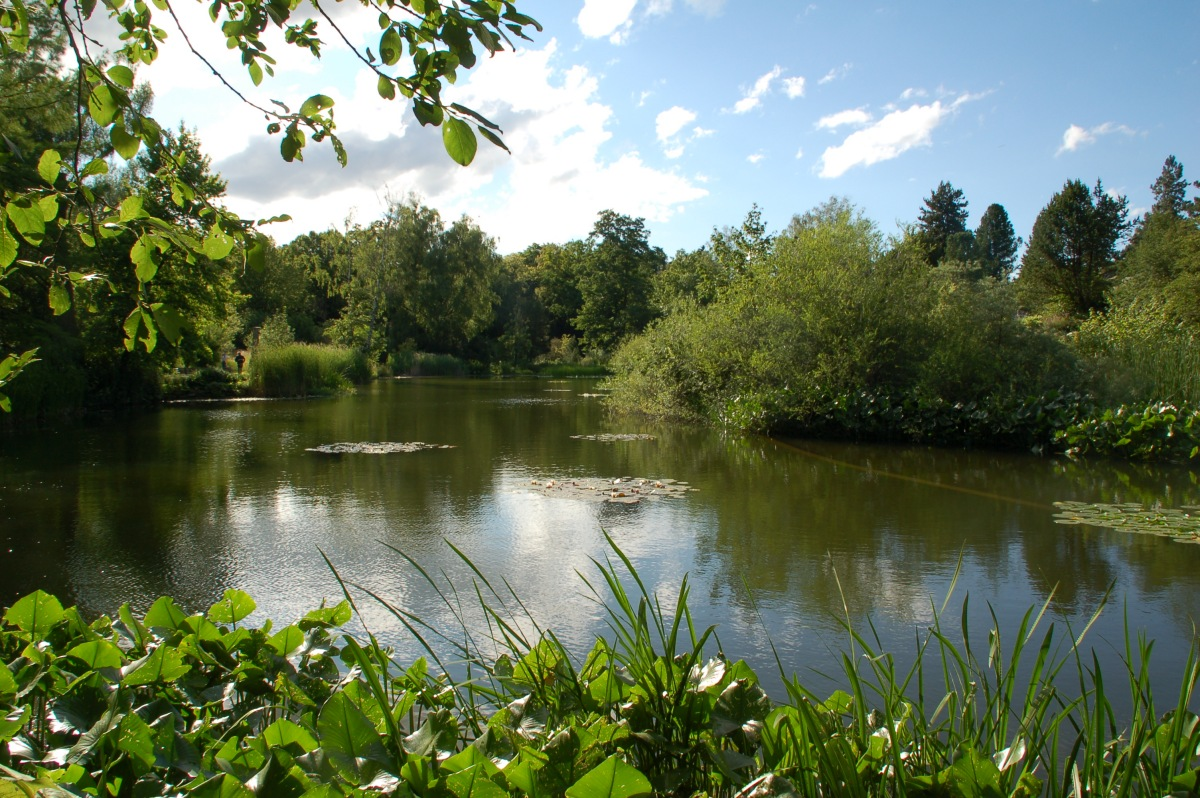
Pond near the Alpine collections

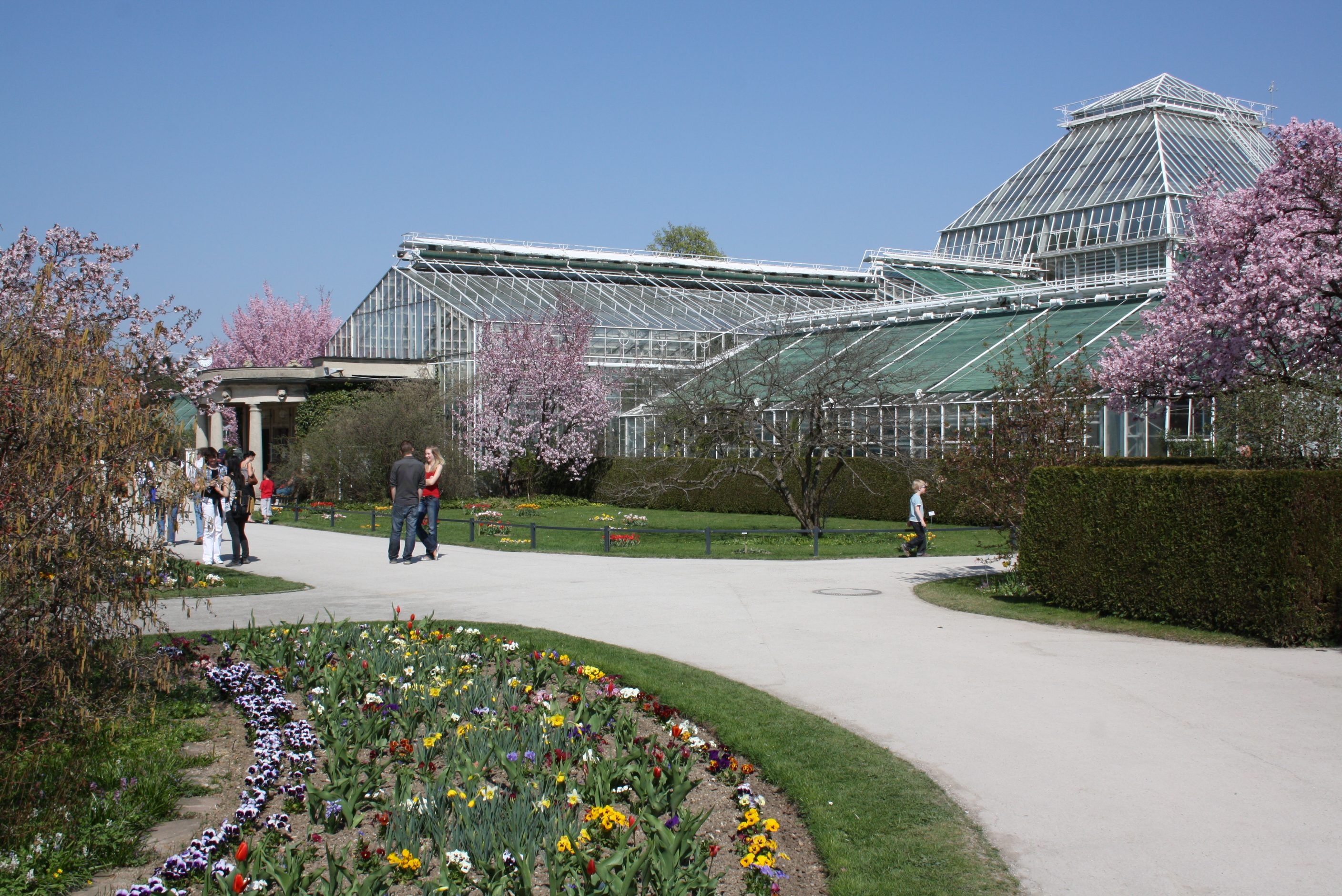
Greenhouses

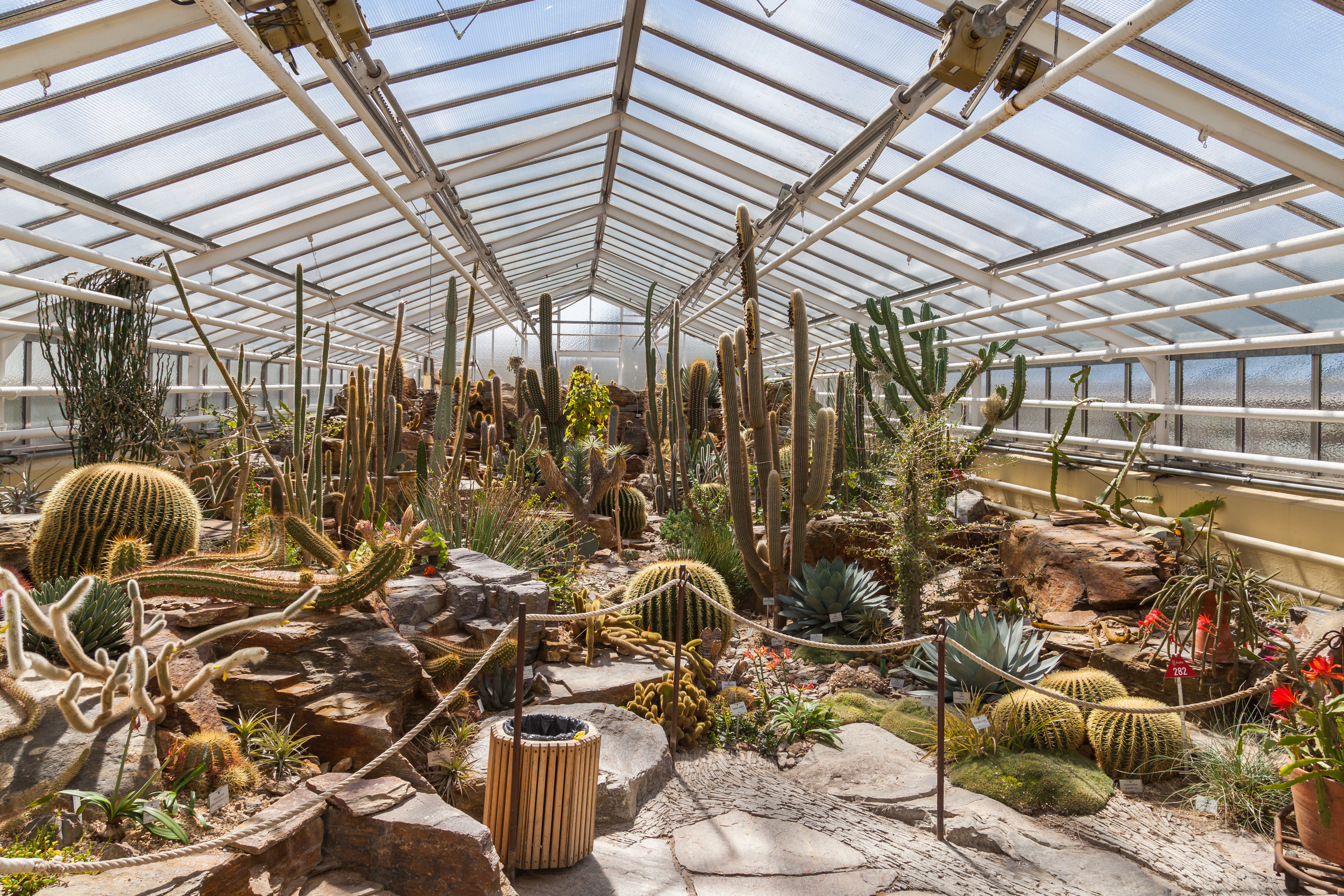
Mexikohaus, desert landscape on display

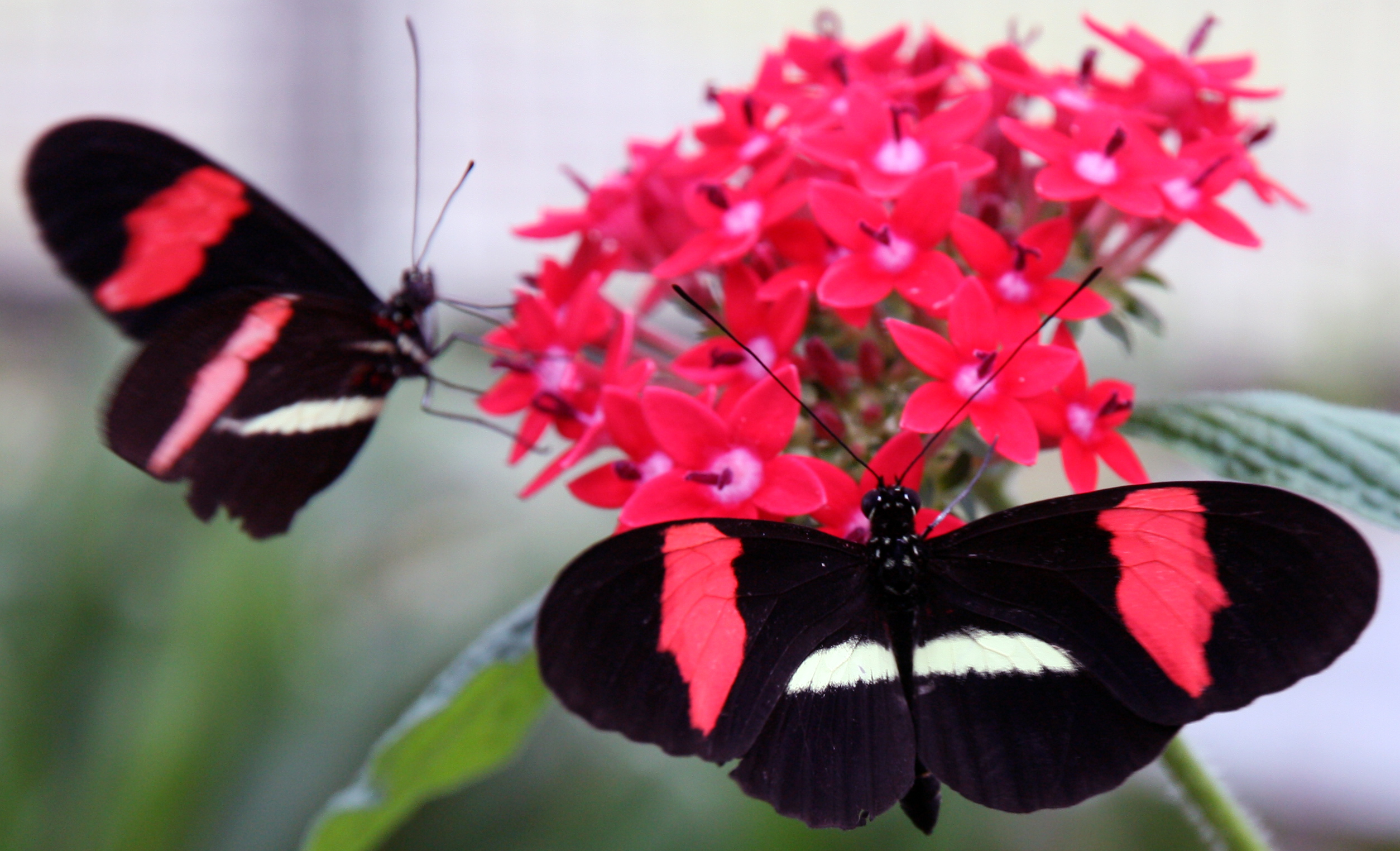
Tropical butterflies – Special exhibition: Heliconius melpomene rosina

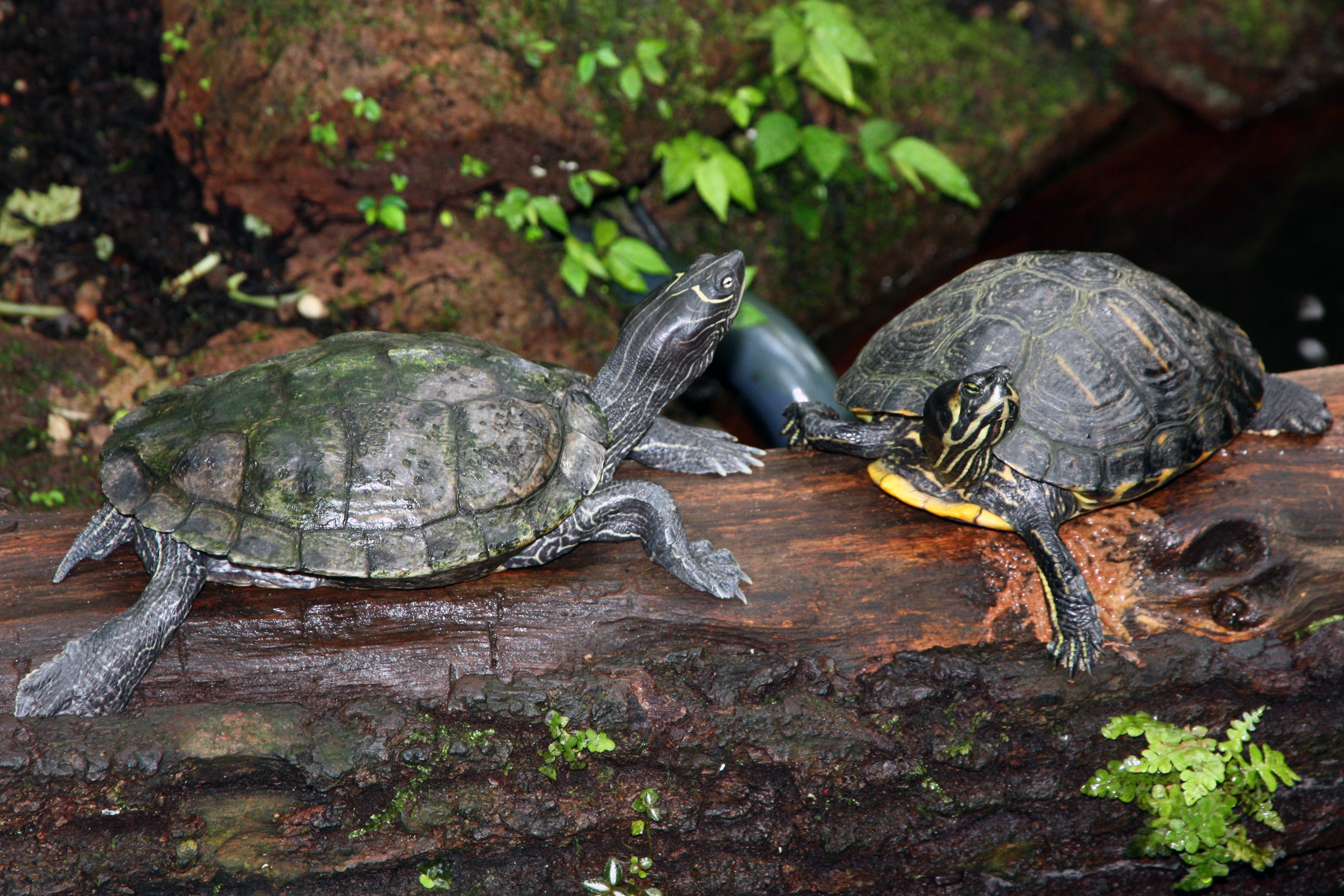
Turtles in greenhouse number 4

The Botanischer Garten München-Nymphenburg is a botanical garden and arboretum in Munich, Germany.

== History ==
Munich's first botanical garden, now called the "Old Botanical Garden", was established in 1809 based on designs by Friedrich Ludwig von Sckell near Karlsplatz, where its remains are still visible. It was replaced by the Botanical Garden of Munich-Nymphenburg in 1912/13, and officially opened on 10 May 1914. The garden was designed by Peter Holfelder who worked closely with Walter Kupper and Leonhard Dillis.

== Description ==
The garden cultivates about 19,600 species and subspecies on an area of 21 hectares (52 acres). Its mission is to provide a beautiful and restful environment as well as educate the public about plants and nature more broadly. Major collections include an alpine garden, an arboretum, rose collections, and a so-called "systematic garden" in which plants are arranged by taxonomic families.

The garden also contains an extensive greenhouse complex (4,500 m^{2} total area in 11 greenhouses), including greenhouses dedicated to bromeliads and aroids Araceae, cacti and succulents, cycads, ferns, orchids, and Mexican plants. The orchid collection includes over 2,700 species from 270 genera, as well as hybrids, with special collections of Catasetinae, Cattleya (unifoliates), Cymbidium, Dendrobium, Dracula, Paphiopedilum, Phragmipedium, Pleione, Stanhopeinae, Vanda, and Zygopetalinae.

The garden also maintains an external station, the Alpengarten auf dem Schachen, at an altitude of 1,860 m.

== Gallery ==
Munich Botanical Garden

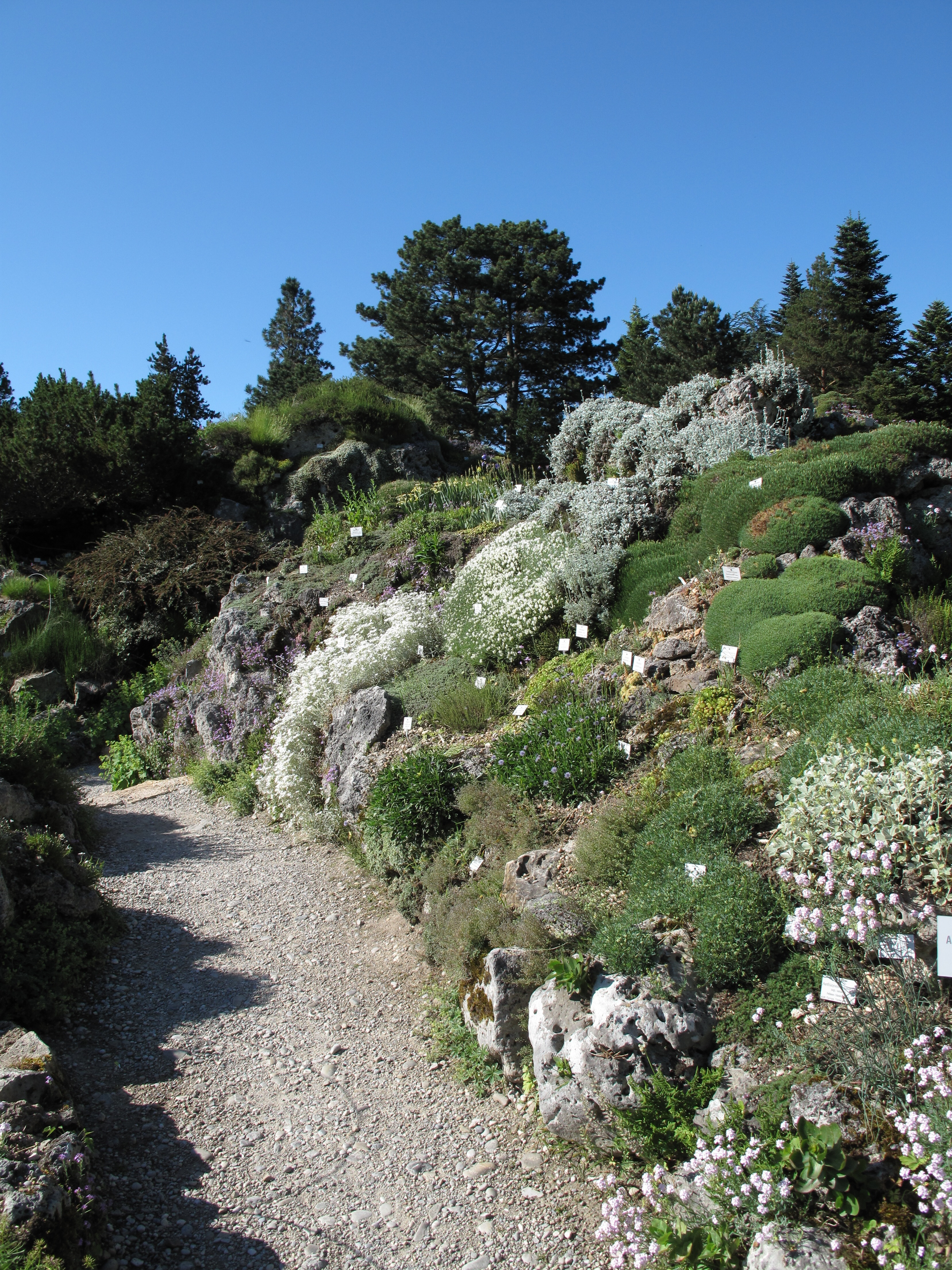
Alpinum

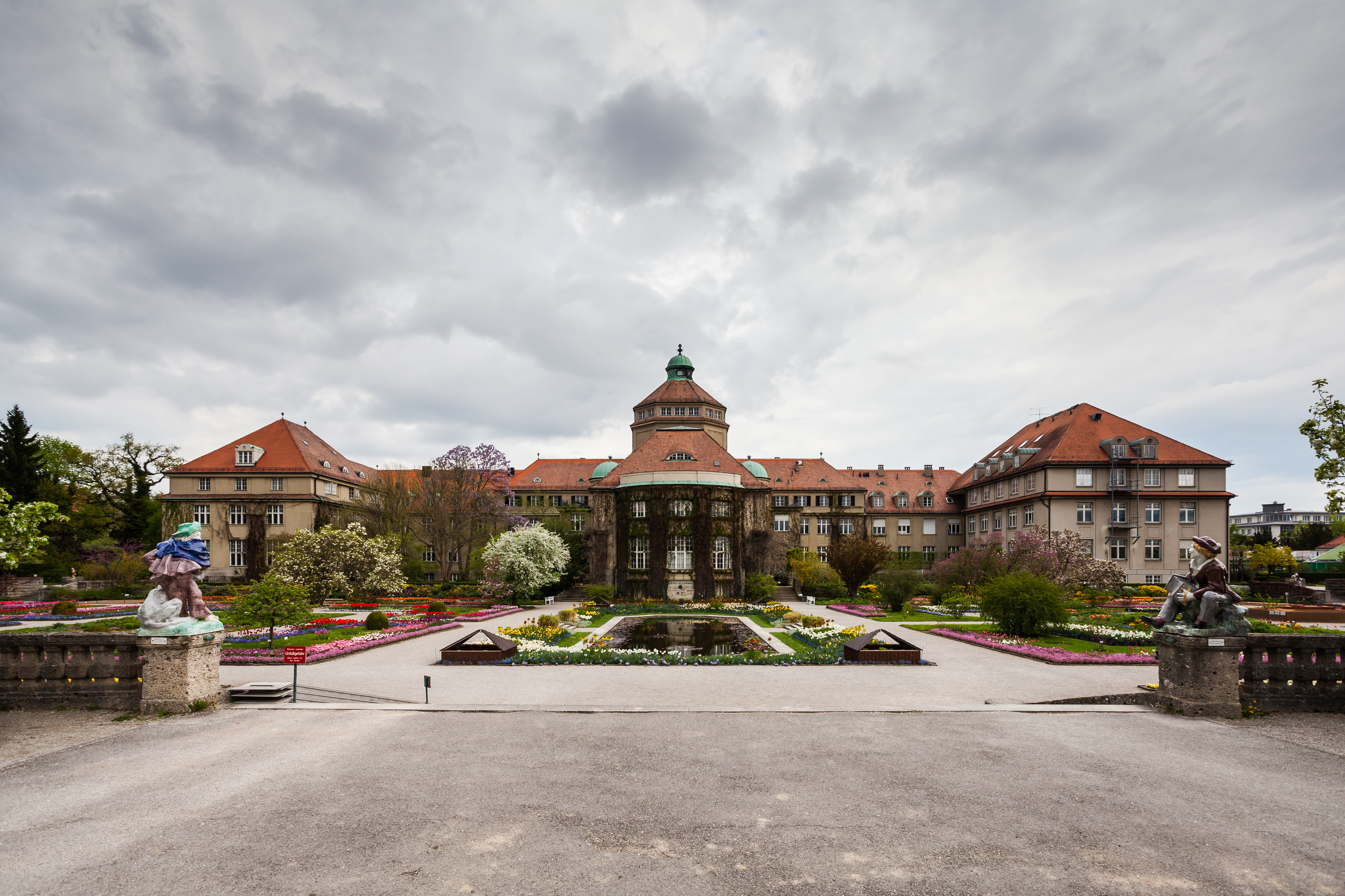
General view

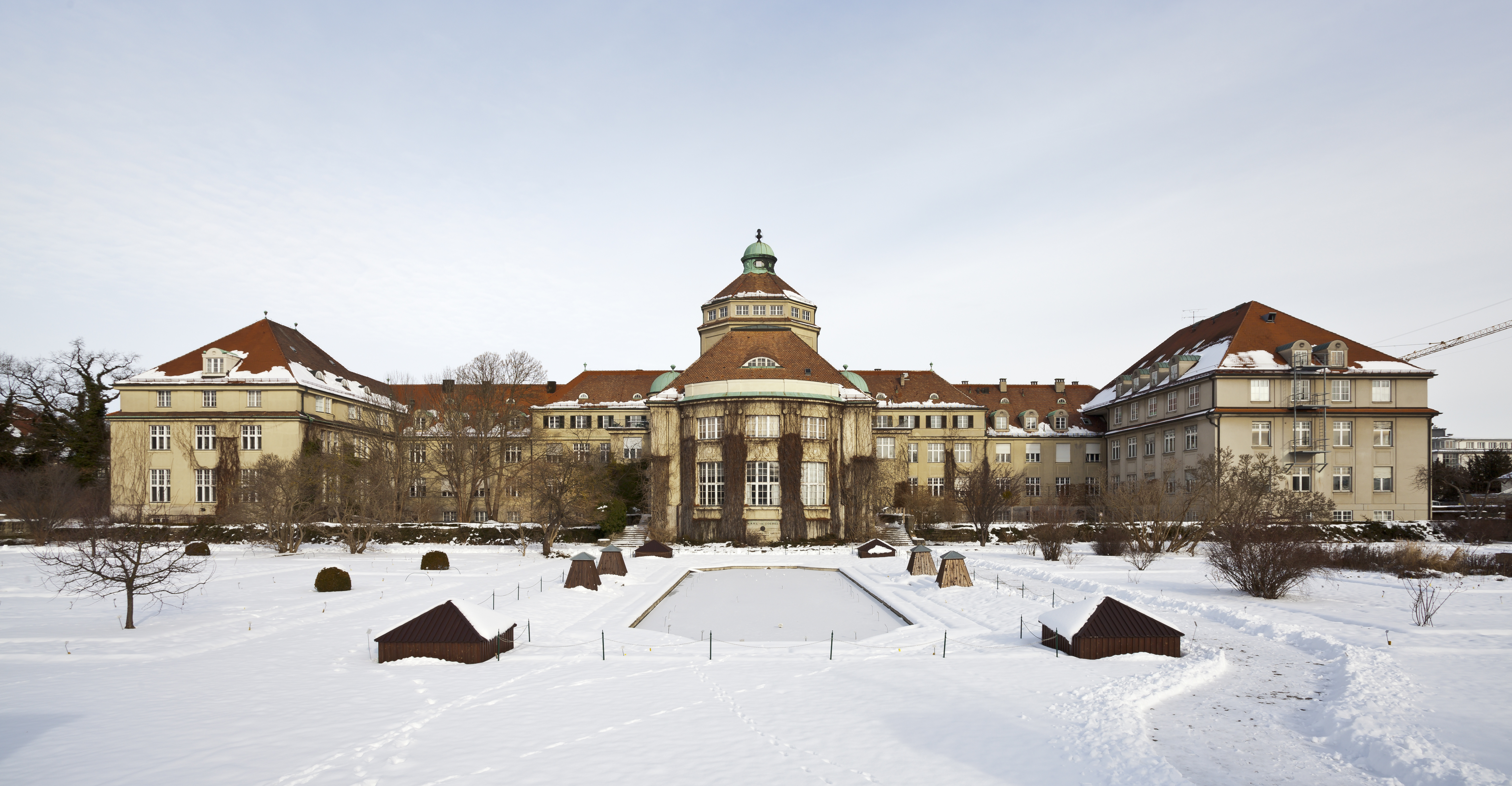
View in winter

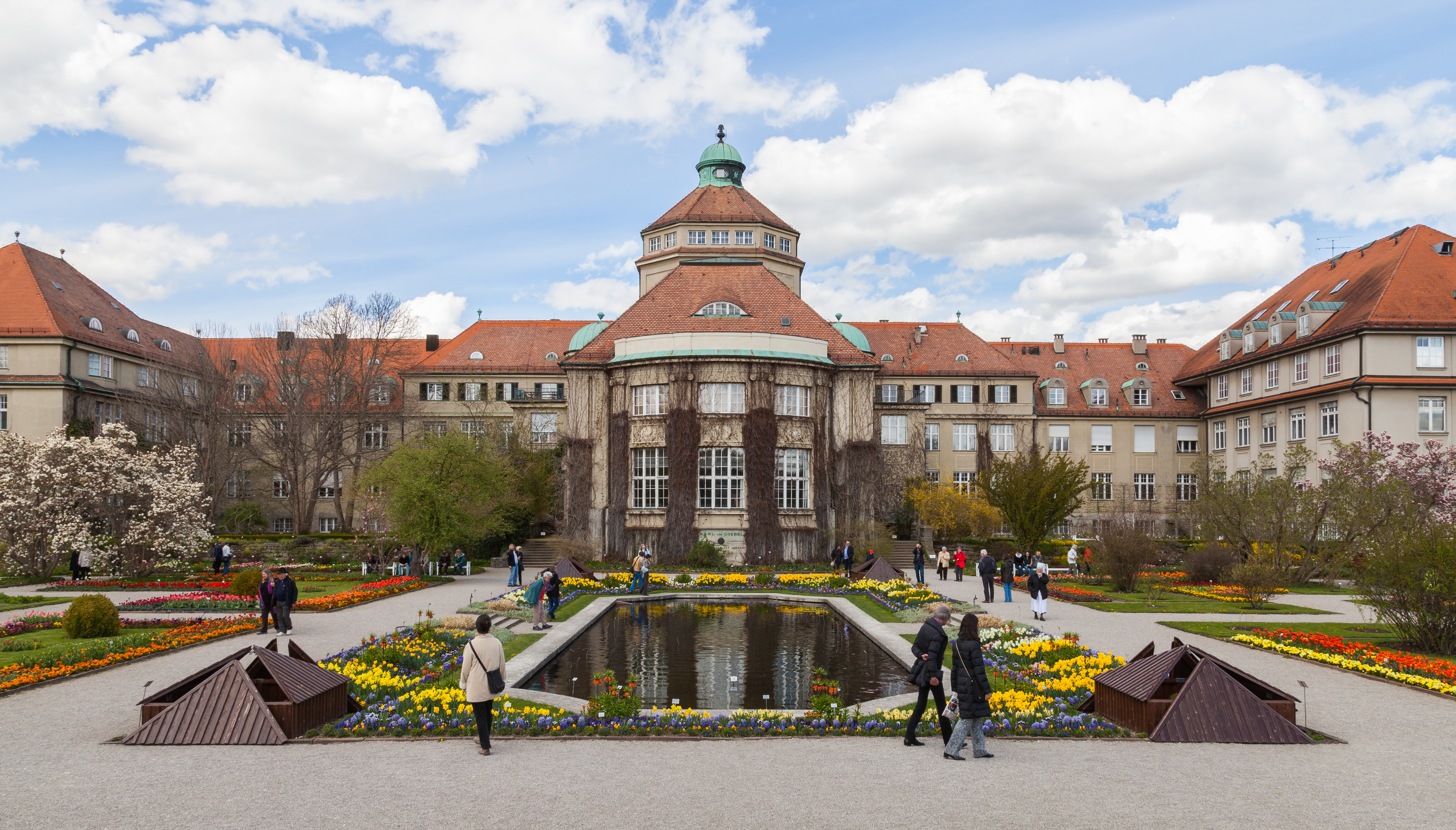
Main building and pond

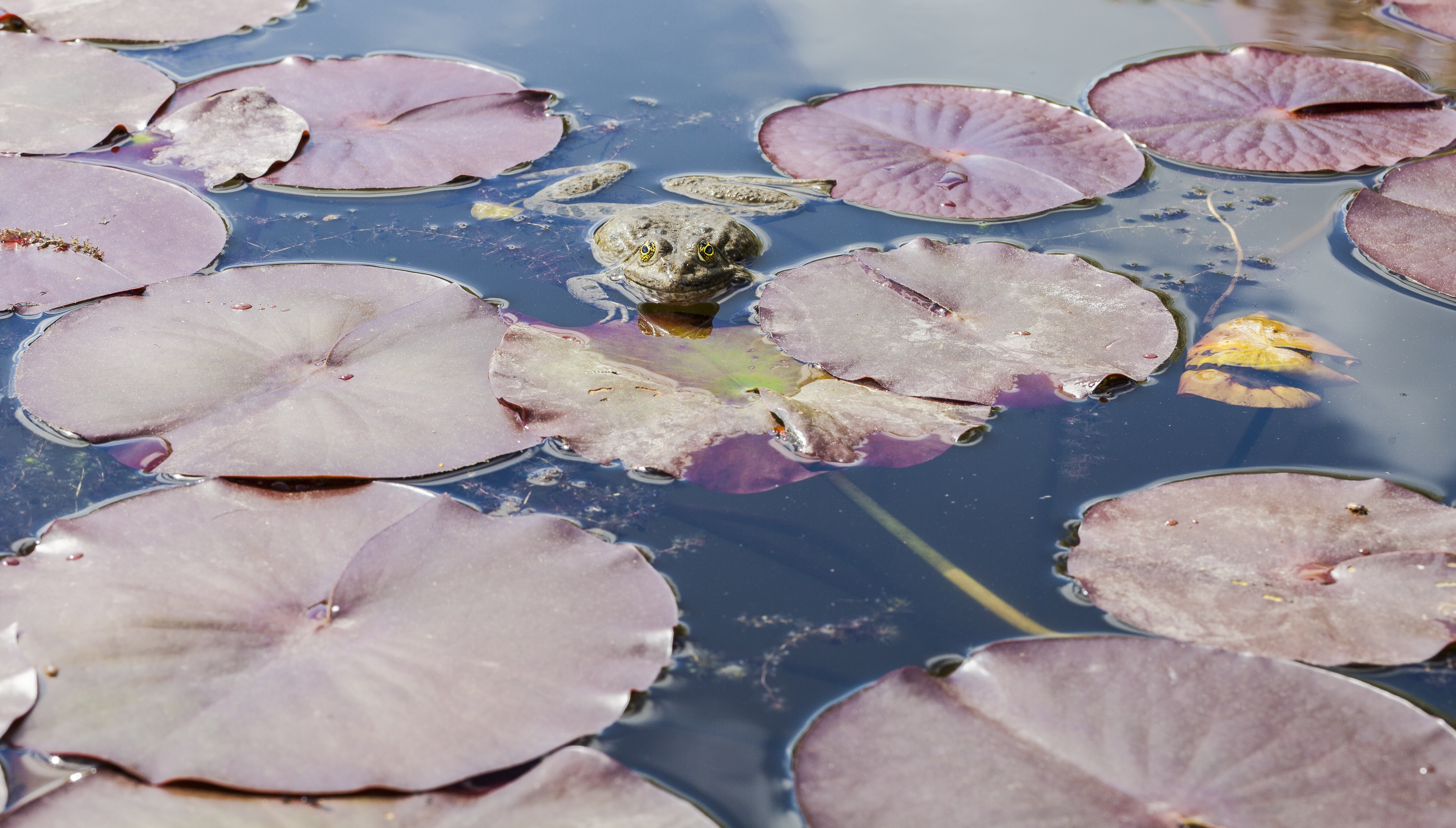
Marsh frog (Pelophylax ridibundus) in the pond of the garden

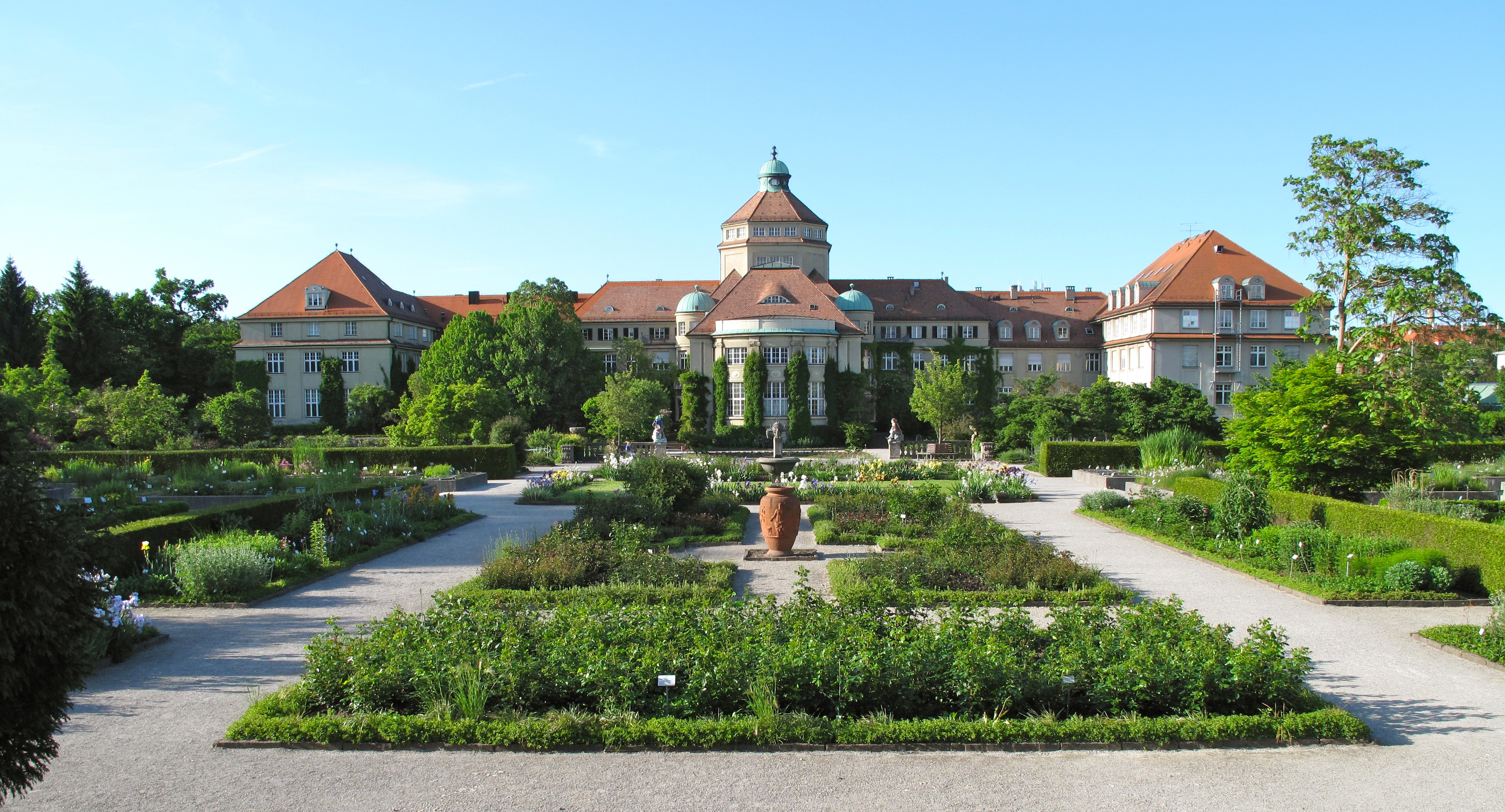
main building

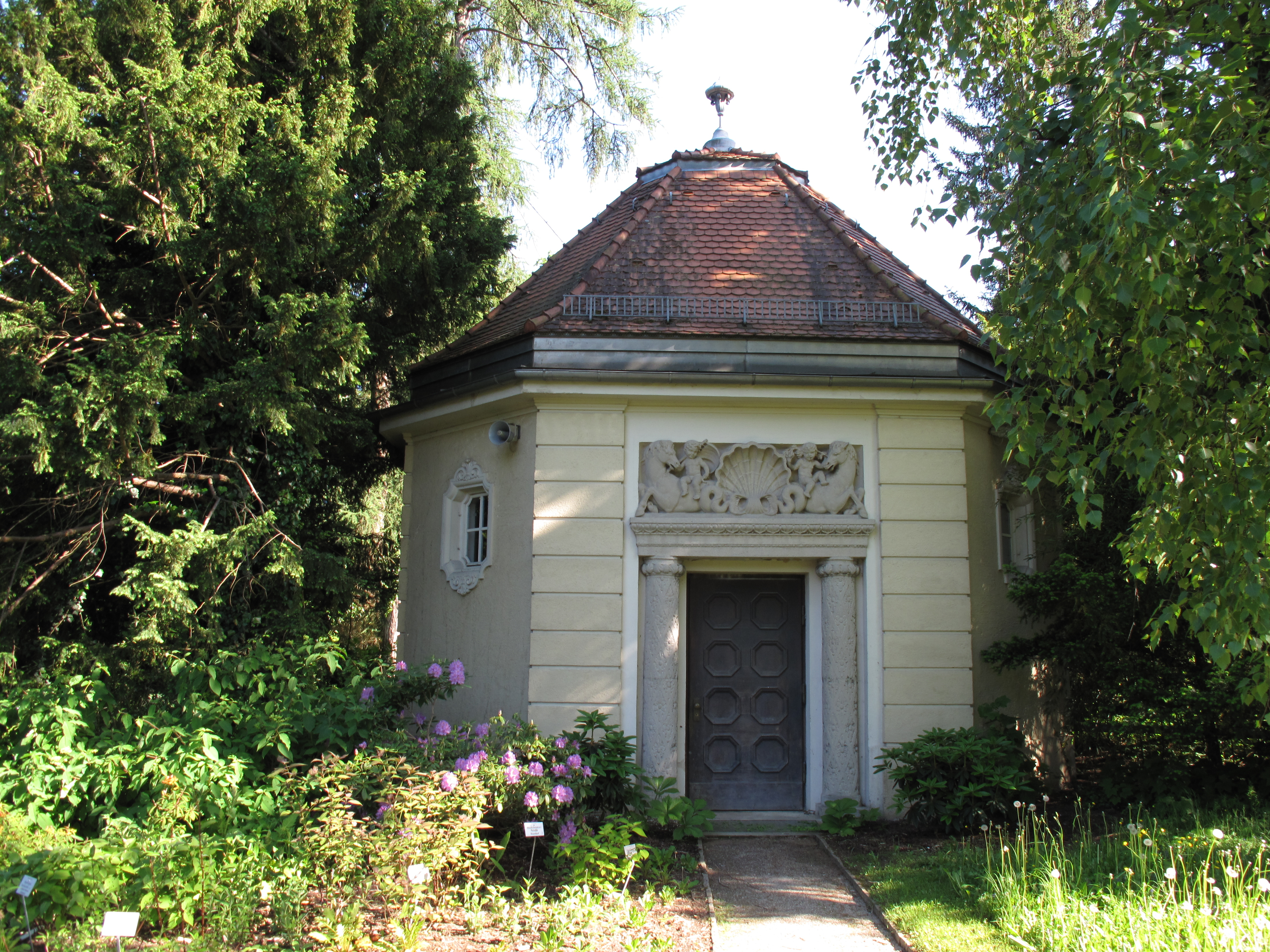
pavilion

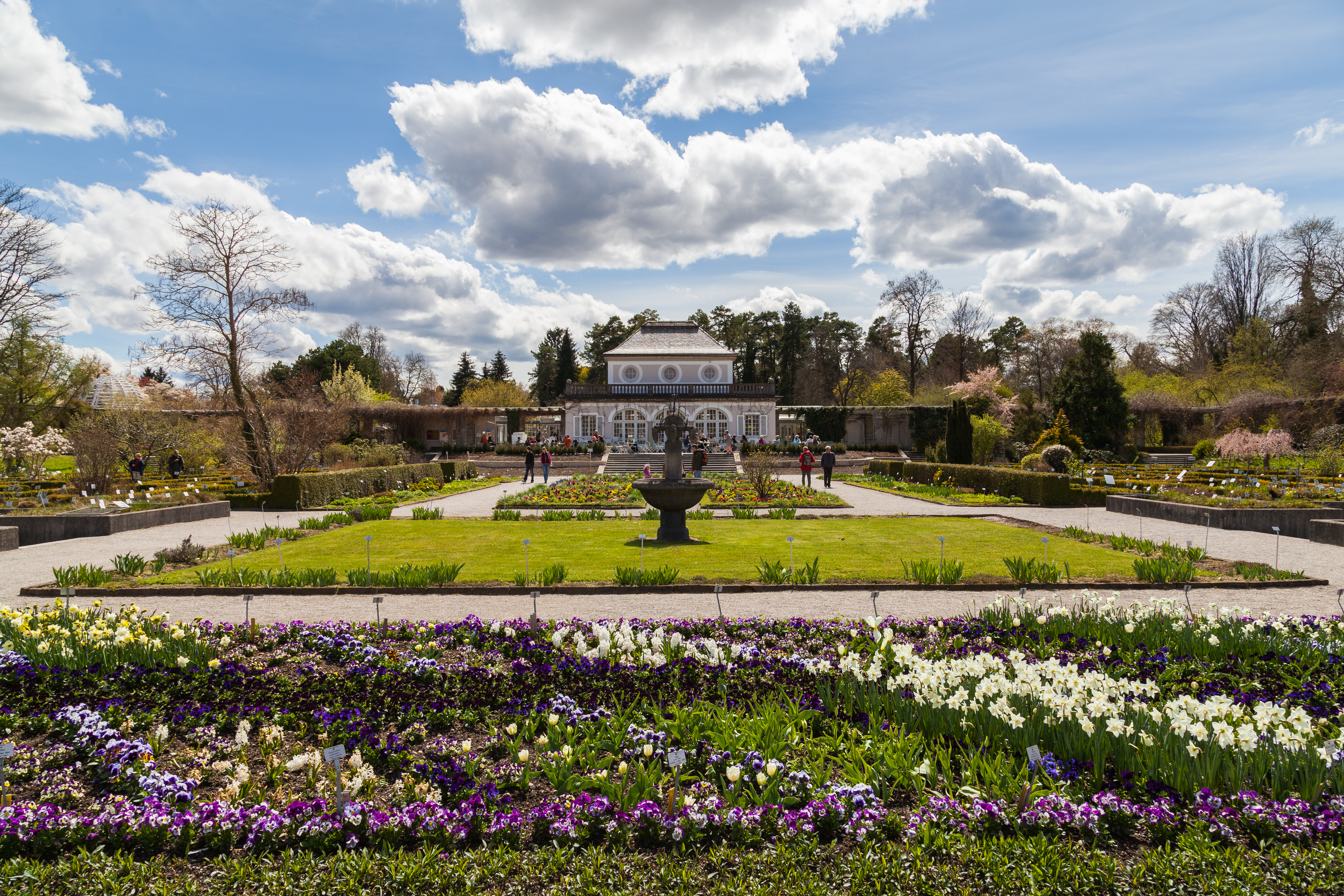
café-building

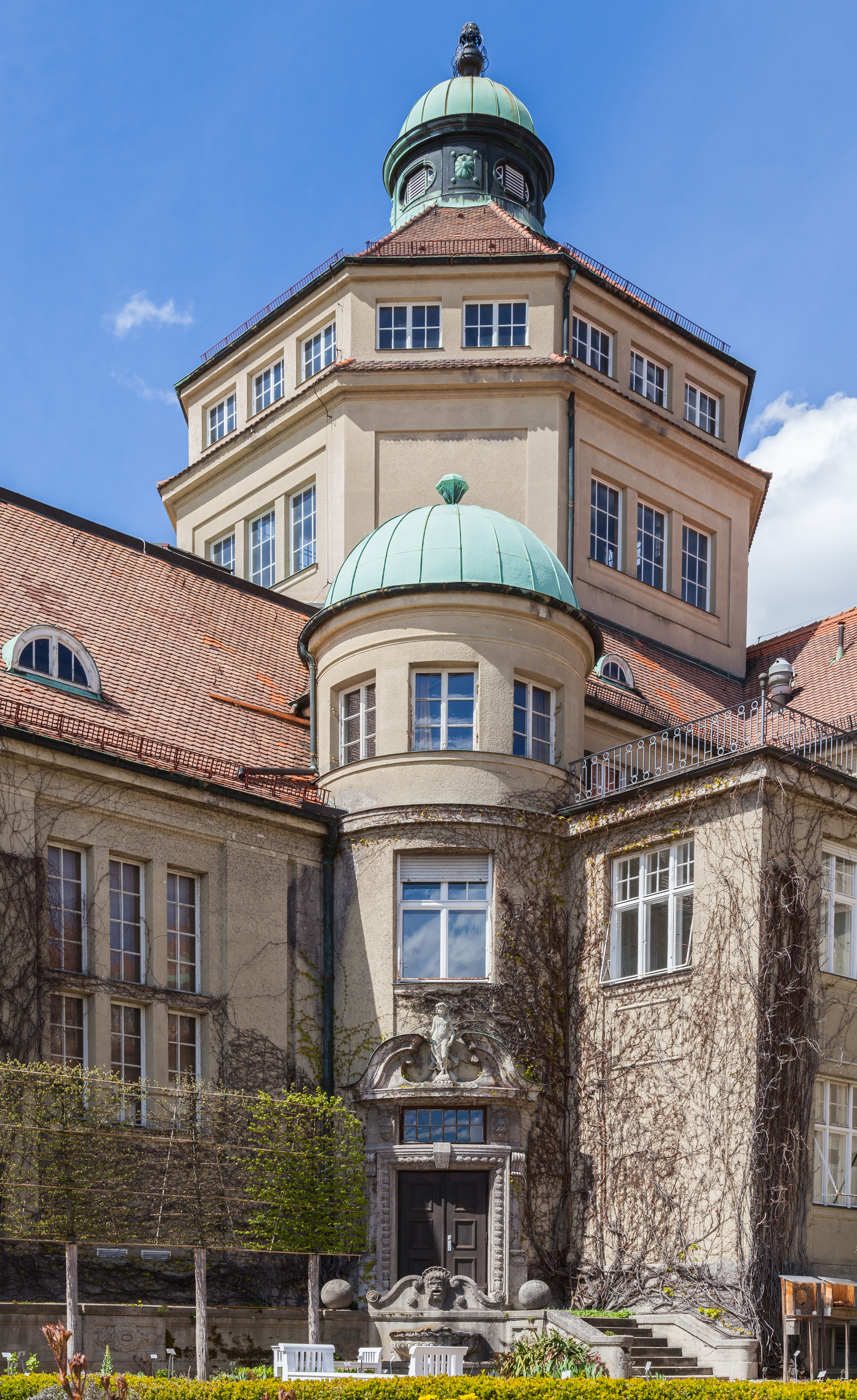
Main building
