= List of eligibility transfers in athletics =

This is a list of track and field athletes who have moved to compete for another national association or federation. Such moves are called transfers of allegiance by the World Athletics.

== To countries in Africa ==
Name of athlete	From nation	To nation	Year	Source
Mohamed Khaled Belabbas	France	Algeria	2011	R11
Yasmina Omrani	France	Algeria	2012	R12
Medhi Amar-Rouana	France	Algeria	2023	R23
Abderrazak Charik	France	Algeria	2025	R25
Fabienne Feraez	France	Benin	2003	R11
Lætitia Bambara	France	Burkina Faso	2012	R12
Onesphore Nzikwinkunda	Qatar	Burundi	2010	R11
Sylvie Mballa Éloundou	France	Cameroon	2005	R11
Fred Salle	Great Britain	Cameroon	1986	
Georgina Toth	Hungary	Cameroon		
Arianne Duarte Morais	Norway	Cape Verde	2025	R25
Hachim Maaroufou	France	Comoros	2022	R22
Richalda Mohamed	France	Comoros	2025	R25
Reïna-Flor Okori	France	Equatorial Guinea	2015	R15
Nusrat Ceesay	Great Britain	Gambia	2011	R11
Mensah Elliot	Great Britain	Gambia	2011	R11
Tim Abeyie	Great Britain	Ghana	2011	R11
Sean Safo-Antwi	Great Britain	Ghana	2016	R16
Akua Obeng-Akrofi	United States	Ghana	2016	R16
Persis William-Mensah	United States	Ghana	2016	R16
Evonne Britton	United States	Ghana	2024	R24
Safiatou Acquaviva	France	Guinea	2024	R24
Fatmata Fofanah	United States	Guinea	2006	R11
Jessica Inchude	Portugal	Guinea-Bissau	2016	R16
Gabriela Kouassi	France	Ivory Coast	2011	R11
Rosvitha Okou	France	Ivory Coast	2012	R12
Leonard Mucheru Maina	Bahrain	Kenya	2007	R11
Sultan Tucker	United States	Liberia		
Kia Davis	United States	Liberia	2007	R11
Emmanuel Matadi	United States	Liberia	2016	R16
Ebony Morrison	United States	Liberia	2021	R21
Thelma Davies	United States	Liberia	2024	R24
Rahmatou Dramé	France	Mali	2010	R11
Richard Diawara	France	Mali	2022	R22
Brahim Lahlafi	France	Morocco	2007	R11
Danielle Alakija	Fiji	Nigeria	2014	R14
Tosin Oke	Great Britain	Nigeria	2009	
Divine Oladipo	Great Britain	Nigeria	2025	R25
Chinwe Okoro	United States	Nigeria	2011	R11
Gloria Asumnu	United States	Nigeria	2011	R11
Regina George	United States	Nigeria	2012	R12
Monzavous Edwards	United States	Nigeria	2014	
Dominique Duncan	United States	Nigeria	2014	R14
Mark Jelks	United States	Nigeria	2014	R14
Nichole Denby	United States	Nigeria	2014	R14
Stephen Mozia	United States	Nigeria	2014	R14
Tameka Jameson	United States	Nigeria	2014	R14
Tyron Akins	United States	Nigeria	2014	R14
Antwon Hicks	United States	Nigeria	2014	R16
Chidi Okezie	United States	Nigeria	2016	R16
Jennifer Madu	United States	Nigeria	2016	R16
Oyesade Olatoye	United States	Nigeria	2019	R19
Lamberte Nyabamikazi	Burkina Faso	Rwanda	2003	R11
Amy Sène	France	Senegal		
Céline Laporte	France	Seychelles	2003	R11
Sherwin Vries	Namibia	South Africa	2003	R11
Tom Petranoff	United States	South Africa	1991	
Yamilé Aldama	Cuba	Sudan	2004	R11
Todd Matthews-Jouda	United States	Sudan	2003	R11
Ahmed Ali	United States	Sudan	2015	R15
Sandrine Thiébaud-Kangni	France	Togo	2001	
Florence Ezeh	France	Togo	2005	
Naomi Akakpo	France	Togo	2022	R22
Mohsen Mohamed Anani	Egypt	Tunisia	2017	R17
Sarah Bensaad	France	Tunisia	2011	R11
Gerald Phiri	Great Britain	Zambia	2009	R11

== To countries in the Americas ==
Name of athlete	From nation	To nation	Year	Source
Amy Harris	Great Britain	Antigua and Barbuda	2014	R14
Diego Zárate	United States	Argentina	2025	R25
Danny Kassap	Congo DR	Canada	2008	
Dariusz Slowik	Denmark	Canada	2004	R11
Steve Agar	Dominica	Canada	1998	R11
Lemlem Bereket	Eritrea	Canada	2008	R11
Maeliss Trapeau	France	Canada	2025	R25
Philomena Mensah	Ghana	Canada	1999	
Martha Adusei	Ghana	Canada	1999	
Graeme Fell	Great Britain	Canada	1983	
William Paulson	Great Britain	Canada	2019	R19
Charles Allen	Guyana	Canada	2002	R11
Miranda Tcheutchoua	Ireland	Canada	2025	R25
Yvonne Saunders	Jamaica	Canada	1973	
Karlene Haughton	Jamaica	Canada	1998	R11
Maresa Cadienhead	Jamaica	Canada	2002	R11
Lieja Tunks	Netherlands	Canada	2006	R11
Yves Sikubwabo	Rwanda	Canada	2019	R19
Anton Skerritt	Trinidad and Tobago	Canada	1986	
Nicole Haynes	United States	Canada	2000	R11
Justin Rodhe	United States	Canada	2011	R12
Kelsie Ahbe	United States	Canada	2015	R15
Johnathan Cabral	United States	Canada	2015	R15
Aiyanna Stiverne	United States	Canada	2015	R15
Kareem Streete-Thompson	United States	Cayman Islands	1999	R11
Santiago Ford	Cuba	Chile	2023	R23
Billy Julio	Venezuela	Colombia	2022	R22
Yordanys Durañona	Cuba	Dominica	2011	R12
Jérôme Romain	France	Dominica	2008	R11
Erison Hurtault	United States	Dominica	2008	
Ezequiel Suárez	Puerto Rico	Dominican Republic	2024	R24
Bianca Acosta	Spain	Dominican Republic	2024	R24
Alvin Harrison	United States	Dominican Republic	2009	R11
Shantia Moss	United States	Dominican Republic	2010	R11
Liuba Zaldívar	Cuba	Ecuador	2019	R19
Claudio Villanueva	Spain	Ecuador	2015	R15
Bralon Taplin	United States	Grenada	2012	R13
Payton Hazzard	United States	Grenada	2014	R14
Carlos Trujillo	United States	Guatemala	2016	R16
Charles Allen	Canada	Guyana	2000	R11
Jenea McCammon	United States	Guyana	2014	
Dudley Dorival	United States	Haiti	1999	R11
Nadine Faustin-Parker	United States	Haiti	1999	
Mulern Jean	United States	Haiti	2016	R16
Wadeline Venlogh	United States	Haiti	2025	R25
Brandon Simpson	Bahrain	Jamaica	2022	R22
Daina Levy	Canada	Jamaica	2016	R16
Aubrey Smith	Canada	Jamaica	2016	R16
Yvonne Mai-Graham	Germany	Jamaica	1993	
Adelle Tracey	Great Britain	Jamaica	2022	R22
Errol Nolan	United States	Jamaica	2012	R12
Kali Davis-White	United States	Jamaica	2016	R16
Leah Nugent	United States	Jamaica	2016	R16
Lloydricia Cameron	United States	Jamaica	2019	R19
Andrew Hudson	United States	Jamaica	2022	R22
Liliana Allen	Cuba	Mexico	1998	R11
Chrystal Ruiz	United States	Mexico	2011	R11
Bayano Kamani	United States	Panama	2003	
David Torrence	United States	Peru	2016	R16
Kimberly Barrett	Jamaica	Puerto Rico	2006	R11
José Antonio Parrilla	United States	Puerto Rico	2000	R11
Allen Simms	United States	Puerto Rico	2005	R11
Samuel Vázquez	United States	Puerto Rico	2011	R11
Jasmine Camacho-Quinn	United States	Puerto Rico	2016	R16
David Adley Smith II	United States	Puerto Rico	2016	R16
Jahvid Best	United States	Saint Lucia	2016	R16
Issam Asinga	United States	Suriname	2023	
Kevon Pierre	Saint Kitts and Nevis	Trinidad and Tobago	2005	R11
Steve Brown	United States	Trinidad and Tobago	1997	
Aaron Armstrong	United States	Trinidad and Tobago	2005	R11
Christopher Hercules	United States	Trinidad and Tobago	2006	R11
Wayne Davis	United States	Trinidad and Tobago	2011	R11
Yanique Haye-Smith	Jamaica	Turks and Caicos Islands	2018	R18
Rai Benjamin	Antigua and Barbuda	United States	2018	R18
Misiker Demisse	Bahrain/Ethiopia	United States	2015	R16
Eddy Hellebuyck	Belgium	United States	2000	R11
Diane Nukuri	Burundi	United States	2020	R20
Chen Yueling	China	United States	2000	R11
Yuliana Pérez	Cuba	United States	2000	
Dailis Caballero	Cuba	United States	2019	R19
Alvin Harrison	Dominican Republic	United States	2015	R15
Bolota Asmerom	Eritrea	United States	2002	R11
Weini Kelati	Eritrea	United States	2021	R21
Atalelech Ketema	Ethiopia	United States	2012	R12
Belaynesh Zemedkun	Ethiopia	United States	2013	R16
Yihunlish Delelecha	Ethiopia	United States	2015	R15
Nadia Prasad	France	United States	2000	R11
Charles Hicks	Great Britain	United States	2026	R25
Barbara Pierre	Haiti	United States	2010	R11
Maggie Chan-Roper	Hong Kong	United States	2006	R11
Conor McCullough	Ireland	United States	2014	R14
Sandra Farmer-Patrick	Jamaica	United States	1989	
Janet Cherobon-Bawcom	Kenya	United States	2011	R11
Mbarak Hussein	Kenya	United States	2004	R11
Bernard Lagat	Kenya	United States	2005	R11
Augustus Maiyo	Kenya	United States	2010	R12
Shadrack Kiptoo Biwott	Kenya	United States	2012	R12
Aron Rono	Kenya	United States	2013	R13
Elkanah Kibet	Kenya	United States	2013	R16
Stanley Kebenei	Kenya	United States	2014	R15
Paul Chelimo	Kenya	United States	2014	R15
Shadrack Kipchirchir	Kenya	United States	2015	R15
Sam Chelanga	Kenya	United States	2015	R16
Leonard Korir	Kenya	United States	2016	R16
Aliphine Tuliamuk	Kenya	United States	2016	R16
Haron Lagat	Kenya	United States	2018	R18
Sally Kipyego	Kenya	United States	2019	R19
Jonah Koech	Kenya	United States	2021	R21
Betsy Saina	Kenya	United States	2021	R21
Benard Kiptoo Koech	Kenya	United States	2025	R25
Nikita Kirillov	Kyrgyzstan	United States	2011	R11
Maia McCoy	United States	Liberia	2024	R25
Maia McCoy	Liberia	United States	2027	R25
Olga Appell	Mexico	United States	1994	
Diego Estrada	Mexico	United States	2011	R14
Khalid Khannouchi	Morocco	United States	2000	R11
Ridouane Harroufi	Morocco	United States	2020	R20
Zouhair Talbi	Morocco	United States	2027	R25
Michael Aish	New Zealand	United States	2010	R11
Christy Opara-Thompson	Nigeria	United States	1998	R11
Amaechi Morton	Nigeria	United States	2012	R12
Stephanie Kalu	Nigeria	United States	2019	R19
Annette Echikunwoke	Nigeria	United States	2022	R22
Stanisława Walasiewicz	Poland	United States	1947	
Allen Simms	Puerto Rico	United States	2008	R11
Adriana Pirtea Nelson	Romania	United States	2011	R11
Nuța Olaru	Romania	United States	2011	R12
Abdihakem Abdirahman	Somalia	United States	2000	R11
Ibrahim Mohamed Aden	Somalia	United States	2001	
Sydney Maree	South Africa	United States	1984	
Colleen De Reuck	South Africa	United States	2002	R11
Guor Marial	South Sudan	United States	2019	R19
Hiruni Wijayaratne	Sri Lanka	United States	2014	R16
Macharia Yuot	Sudan	United States	2007	R11
Andreas Gustafsson	Sweden	United States	2019	R19
Niklas Arrhenius	Sweden	United States	2020	R20
Natasha Alleyne-Gibson	Trinidad and Tobago	United States	2000	R11
Phillimon Hanneck	Zimbabwe	United States	1999	R11
Pardon Ndhlovu	Zimbabwe	United States	2023	R23
Valma Bass	Saint Kitts and Nevis	United States Virgin Islands	2002	R11
Jeff Jackson	United States	United States Virgin Islands	1999	R11
Eddie Lovett	United States	United States Virgin Islands	2013	R13
Julia Paternain	Great Britain	Uruguay	2025	R25

== To countries in Asia ==
Transfers to countries that are members of the Asian Athletics Association.

Name of athlete	From nation	To nation	Year	Source
Maryam Yusuf Jamal	Ethiopia	Bahrain	2004	
Tejitu Daba	Ethiopia	Bahrain	2009	
Shitaye Eshete	Ethiopia	Bahrain	2009	
Dejenee Regassa	Ethiopia	Bahrain	2009	
Bilisuma Shugi	Ethiopia	Bahrain	2009	
Dalila Abdulkadir	Ethiopia	Bahrain	2013	R15
Aweke Ayalew	Ethiopia	Bahrain	2013	R13
Zelalem Bacha	Ethiopia	Bahrain	2013	R13
Shumi Dechasa	Ethiopia	Bahrain	2013	R14
Desi Mokonin	Ethiopia	Bahrain	2013	R15
Birhanu Balew	Ethiopia	Bahrain	2014	R15
Tigist Gashaw	Ethiopia	Bahrain	2014	R15
Bontu Rebitu	Ethiopia	Bahrain	2015	R15
Fatmata Fofanah	Guinea	Bahrain	2008	R11
Brandon Simpson	Jamaica	Bahrain	2006	R11
Yusuf Saad Kamel (Gregory Konchella)	Kenya	Bahrain	2003	R11
Mushir Salem Jawher (Leonard Mucheru)	Kenya	Bahrain	2003	R11
Abel Yagout Jawher (Abel Cheruiyot)	Kenya	Bahrain	2003	R11
Ishaq Isa Abedeen	Kenya	Bahrain	2005 ?	
Belal Mansoor Ali	Kenya	Bahrain	2005 ?	
Aadam Ismaeel Khamis (Hosea Kosgei)	Kenya	Bahrain	2005 ?	
Tareq Mubarak Taher	Kenya	Bahrain	2005	
Khalid Kamal Yaseen	Kenya	Bahrain	2005	
Hasan Mahboob	Kenya	Bahrain	2006	
Monica Jepkoech	Kenya	Bahrain	2008	
Evans Chematot	Kenya	Bahrain	2013	R15
Nelson Cherutich	Kenya	Bahrain	2013	R13
Eunice Chumba	Kenya	Bahrain	2013	R14
Ruth Jebet	Kenya	Bahrain	2013	R14
Eunice Kirwa	Kenya	Bahrain	2013	R14
John Kibet Koech	Kenya	Bahrain	2013	R14
Isaac Korir (Isaac Kedikou)	Kenya	Bahrain	2013	R13
Damaris Muthee Mutua	Kenya	Bahrain	2013	R14
Albert Rop	Kenya	Bahrain	2013	R14
Abraham Rotich	Kenya	Bahrain	2013	R13
Benson Seurei	Kenya	Bahrain	2013	R13
Abdelhak Zakaria	Morocco	Bahrain	2001 ?	
Rashid Mohamed	Morocco	Bahrain	2002	
Rashid Ramzi	Morocco	Bahrain	2002	
Nadia Ejjafini	Morocco	Bahrain	2003	
El-Hassan El-Abbassi	Morocco	Bahrain	2013	R14
Hassan Chani	Morocco	Bahrain	2015	R15
Sadik Mikhou	Morocco	Bahrain	2015	
Kemi Adekoya	Nigeria	Bahrain	2013	R14
Zheng Ninali	Canada	China	2021	
Leila Rajabi	Belarus	Iran	2007	
Takeshi Fujiwara	El Salvador	Japan	2013	
Takhir Mamashayev	Belarus	Kazakhstan	2001	
Lauren Hoffman	United States	Philippines	2023	
Jessica Laurance	Australia	Philippines	2025	R25
Musa Amer Obaid	Kenya	Qatar		
Mohamed Suleiman	Somalia	Qatar		
Onèsphore Nkunzimana	Burundi	Qatar		
Ahmad Hassan Abdullah	Kenya	Qatar		
Saif Saaeed Shaheen	Kenya	Qatar	2003	
James Kwalia	Kenya	Qatar	2004	
Nicholas Kemboi	Kenya	Qatar	2005	
Bellor Minigwo Yator	Kenya	Qatar		
Daham Najim Bashir	Kenya	Qatar		
Gamal Belal Salem	Kenya	Qatar		
Essa Ismail Rashed	Kenya	Qatar		
Majed Saeed Sultan	Kenya	Qatar		
Salem Amer Al-Badri	Kenya	Qatar		
Thamer Kamal Ali	Kenya	Qatar		
Felix Kibore	Kenya	Qatar	2007	
Rashid K. Jamal	Ethiopia	Qatar		
Mubarak Hassan Shami	Kenya	Qatar		
Edrees Kamal Eisa	Ethiopia	Qatar		
Faisal Bader Shebto	Kenya	Qatar		
Moustafa Ahmed Shebto	Uganda	Qatar	2004	
Samuel Francis	Nigeria	Qatar	2007	
Charles Bett Koech	Kenya	Qatar	2007	
Femi Ogunode	Nigeria	Qatar	2010	
Ashraf Amgad El-Seify	Egypt	Qatar		
Ibrahim Abdelrahman	Egypt	Qatar	2025	R25
Mohamed Wahid Torech	Tunisia	Qatar	2026	R25
Du Xianhui	China	Singapore	2003	
Zhang Guirong	China	Singapore	2003	
Juttaporn Krasaeyan	China	Thailand		
Saeed Besweidan	Yemen	United Arab Emirates	2000	
Alia Saeed Mohammed	Ethiopia	United Arab Emirates	2010	
Marian Adullah Mubarak	Ethiopia	United Arab Emirates	2010	
Emmanuel Bamidele	Nigeria	United Arab Emirates	2025	R25
Andrey Abduvaliyev	Tajikistan	Uzbekistan	1997	
Erkinjon Isakov	Russia	Uzbekistan	1999	
Mariya Sokova	Russia	Uzbekistan		

== To countries in Europe ==
Transfers to countries that are members of the European Athletic Association.

Name of athlete	From nation	To nation	Year
Yipsi Moreno	Cuba	Albania	2025
Nina Zarina	Russia	Armenia	2024
Ljudmila Ninova-Rudoll	Bulgaria	Austria	
Mark McKoy	Canada	Austria	1994
Valentina Fedjuschina	Ukraine	Austria	1999
Serhiy Osovych	Ukraine	Austria	2003
Nora Ivanova	Turkey	Austria	2008
Christania Williams	Jamaica	Austria	2025
Hanna Skydan	Ukraine	Azerbaijan	2015
Evans Kiplagat Barkowet	Kenya	Azerbaijan	2016
Andrey Makarov	Russia	Belarus	1998
Aleksandr Furso	Russia	Belarus	1999
Takhir Mamashayev	Uzbekistan	Belarus	2001
Sergey Litvinov	Russia	Belarus	2004
Mohammed Mourhit	Morocco	Belgium	1997
Yelena Golesheva-Scheers	Russia	Belgium	1998
Stefanija Statkuviené	Lithuania	Belgium	1998
Olivier Sekanyambo	DR Congo	Belgium	1999
Élodie Ouédraogo	Burkina Faso	Belgium	2000
Hassan Mourhit	Morocco	Belgium	2003
Irina Sustelo	Portugal	Belgium	2005
Atelaw Yeshetela	Ethiopia	Belgium	2008
Svetlana Bolshakova	Russia	Belgium	2008
Mira Preradović	FR Yugoslavia	Bosnia and Herzegovina	2002
Borivoje Stanić	Serbia and Montenegro	Bosnia and Herzegovina	2003
Mirjana Kalajdžić	Serbia and Montenegro	Bosnia and Herzegovina	2003
Predrag Momirović	Serbia and Montenegro	Bosnia and Herzegovina	2004
Tanja Glicic	Serbia and Montenegro	Bosnia and Herzegovina	2006
Maja Jancic	Serbia and Montenegro	Bosnia and Herzegovina	2006
Milan Radulović	Serbia and Montenegro	Bosnia and Herzegovina	2006
Lucia Kimani	Kenya	Bosnia and Herzegovina	2007
András Haklits	Hungary	Croatia	1998
Roland Varga	Hungary	Croatia	2008
Lisa Nemec	United States	Croatia	
Marianna Zachariadi	Greece	Cyprus	2008
Dimitrios Chondrokoukis	Greece	Cyprus	2013
Róbert Štefko	Slovakia	Czech Republic	2004
Josef Karas	Canada	Czech Republic	2005
Volodymyr Myslyvčuk	Ukraine	Czech Republic	2024
Luka Ćurković	Croatia	Czech Republic	2026
Robert Kiplagat Andersen	Kenya	Denmark	
Wilson Kipketer	Kenya	Denmark	
Larissa Netšeporuk	Ukraine	Estonia	
Eduard Hämäläinen	Belarus	Finland	1997
Natalia Kilpeläinen	Russia	Finland	2005
Wilson Kirwa	Kenya	Finland	1998
Francis Kirwa	Kenya	Finland	2005
Frantz Kruger	South Africa	Finland	2007
Abdelkader Bakhtache	Algeria	France	2006
Eunice Barber	Sierra Leone	France	1999
Abdellah Béhar	Morocco	France	
Saïd Berioui	Morocco	France	2009
Abdessemad Bouhattach	Morocco	France	2003
Mickaël Conjungo	Central African Republic	France	
Ahmed Douhou	Ivory Coast	France	2002
Lueyi Dovy	Gabon	France	2002
Sylvie Mballa Éloundou	Cameroon	France	2002
Hanan Farhoun	Morocco	France	2006
Fanjanteino Félix	Madagascar	France	2009
Bouchra Ghezielle	Morocco	France	2005
Hind Dehiba	Morocco	France	2004
Latifa Essarokh	Morocco	France	1996
Rachid Ghanmouni	Morocco	France	2010
Fatima Hajjami	Morocco	France	
Abderrahim El Haouzy	Morocco	France	
Numidia Kafri	Algeria	France	
Héni Kechi	Tunisia	France	2004
Fatiha Klilech-Fauvel	Morocco	France	2003
Sylwia Korzeniowska	Poland	France	2010
El Hassan Lahssini	Morocco	France	2001
Irba Lakhal	Morocco	France	2002
Driss Maazouzi	Morocco	France	2000
Rakiya Maraoui-Quétier	Morocco	France	1998
Margaret Maury	Kenya	France	2002
Françoise Mbango Etone	Cameroon	France	2010
Rodica Nagel	Romania	France	
Simon Munyutu	Kenya	France	2006
Antoinette Nana Djimou Ida	Cameroon	France	
Emmanuel Ngom Priso	Cameroon	France	2009
Issa-Aimé Nthépé	Cameroon	France	1999
Teresa Nzola Meso Ba	Angola	France	2003
Nicole Ramalalanirina	Madagascar	France	1998
Ferenc Salbert	Hungary	France	
Mohamed Serbouti	Morocco	France	
Ismaïl Sghyr	Morocco	France	2002
Yvon Sialo-Ngboda	Central African Republic	France	2007
Melanie Skotnik	Germany	France	2005
Brahim Lahlafi	Morocco	France	2006
Jérôme Romain	Dominica	France	1999
Nouredine Smain	Algeria	France	2005
James Theuri	Kenya	France	2006
Cheikh Touré	Senegal	France	2000
Dauphin Tumatai	French Polynesia	France	2007
Ibrahima Wade	Senegal	France	2000
Larbi Zéroual	Morocco	France	1999
Fabien Bernabe	Spain	France	2015
Ousmane Diarra	Senegal	France	
Franck Elemba	Republic of the Congo	France	2024
Halina Górecka	Poland	West Germany	1965
Jürgen May	East Germany	West Germany	1967
Andrzej Badeński	Poland	West Germany	1974
Józef Szmidt	Poland	West Germany	1975
Władysław Kozakiewicz	Poland	West Germany	1984
Wolfgang Schmidt	East Germany	West Germany	1987
Nischan Daimer	Armenia	Germany	
Andrei Tivontchik	Belarus	Germany	1994
Alina Astafei	Romania	Germany	1995
Nastja Ryjikh	Russia	Germany	1995
Luminita Zaituc	Romania	Germany	1996
Irina Mikitenko	Kazakhstan	Germany	1998
Nkechi Madubuko	Nigeria	Germany	
Florence Ekpo-Umoh	Nigeria	Germany	2000
Alexsey Bogdasin	Kazakhstan	Germany	2006
Sergey Lytvynov Jr.	Belarus	Germany	2007
Eleni Gebremehdin-Gebrehiwot	Ethiopia	Germany	2014
Julia Bleasdale	Great Britain	Germany	2016
Maryna Kovtunova	Ukraine	Germany	2025
Zola Budd	South Africa	Great Britain	1984
Zola Budd	Great Britain	South Africa	1992
Fred Salle	Cameroon	Great Britain	1992
Birhan Dagne	Ethiopia	Great Britain	1998
Bobby Farren	Ireland	Great Britain	1998
Kathy Butler	Canada	Great Britain	2000
James McIlroy	Ireland	Great Britain	2000
Irie Hill	Germany	Great Britain	2000
Kassa Tadesse	Ethiopia	Great Britain	2001
Samson Oni	Nigeria	Great Britain	2003
Malachi Davis	United States	Great Britain	2004
Nathalie Harvey	Australia	Great Britain	2004
Simon Shirley	Australia	Great Britain	
Nicholas Stuart	Canada	Great Britain	2005
Gerenshi Tamirat	Ethiopia	Great Britain	2005
Germaine Mason	Jamaica	Great Britain	2006
Tomas Abyu	Ethiopia	Great Britain	2006
Taneisha Robinson-Scanlon	Ireland	Great Britain	2006
Michael Bingham	United States	Great Britain	2008
Roald Bradstock	United States	Great Britain	2009
Tiffany Porter	United States	Great Britain	2010
Shara Proctor	Anguilla	Great Britain	2010
Shana Cox	United States	Great Britain	2011
Julian Reid	Jamaica	Great Britain	2011
Stefanie Reid	Canada	Great Britain	2010
Yamilé Aldama	Cuba	Sudan	2004
Yamilé Aldama	Sudan	Great Britain	2011
Zharnel Hughes	Anguilla	Great Britain	2015
Victoria Dronsfield	Sweden	Great Britain	2015
Daniel Lewis	Jamaica	Great Britain	2024
Kidane Tadesse	Eritrea	Great Britain	2025
Chioma Okonkwo	United States	Great Britain	2025
Malique Smith-Band	Jamaica	Great Britain	2026
Alexandros Terzian	Argentina	Greece	
Mirela Maniani	Albania	Greece	1997
Anastasios Eliopoulos	Canada	Greece	2024
Iasonas Koniaris	Denmark	Greece	2025
Simona Staicu	Romania	Hungary	2000
Éva Miklós	Romania	Hungary	2003
Attila Farkas	Israel	Hungary	2004
Tommy Kafri	Israel	Hungary	2007
Apor Jakab	Romania	Hungary	2026
Jeff Cassin	Canada	Ireland	1998
Dermot Donnelly	Great Britain	Ireland	1998
Sean Wade	New Zealand	Ireland	1999
Adrienne McIvor	Australia	Ireland	2000
Stephan Hayward	Great Britain	Ireland	2001
Alistair Cragg	South Africa	Ireland	2002
Alkin Westley	Canada	Ireland	2003
Jolene Elizabeth Byrne	United States	Ireland	2004
Jerome Krahenbuhl	Switzerland	Ireland	2004
Samuel Okantey	Ghana	Ireland	2002
Brendan Reilly	Great Britain	Ireland	1999
Sarah Reilly	Great Britain	Ireland	2000
Brian Doyle	Great Britain	Ireland	2006
Mark Crowley	Great Britain	Ireland	2008
Kevin Brown	Great Britain	Ireland	2008
Zoë Brown	Great Britain	Ireland	2008
Stephen Murphy	Great Britain	Ireland	2010
Ben Reynolds	Great Britain	Ireland	2012
Liam Zamel-Paez	Australia	Ireland	2014
Barbara Sanchez	France	Ireland	2014
Kevin Batt	Australia	Ireland	2014
Alex Wright	Great Britain	Ireland	2015
Katie Kirk	Great Britain	Ireland	2015
Mary Cain	United States	Ireland	2024
James Gormley	Great Britain	Ireland	2024
Jamie Moffatt	Great Britain	Ireland	2025
Hannah Seagrave	Great Britain	Ireland	2025
Benjamin Richardson	South Africa	Ireland	2027
Asaf Bimro	Ethiopia	Israel	1984
Mark Handelsman	South Africa	Israel	
Aleksey Bazarov	Soviet Union	Israel	
Aleksandr Fingert	Soviet Union	Israel	
Vadim Bavikin	Soviet Union	Israel	1990
Ayele Seteng	Ethiopia	Israel	1991
Brian Mondschein	United States	Israel	2010
Wodage Zvadya	Ethiopia	Israel	1991
Danny Krasnov	Soviet Union	Israel	1991
Svetlana Gnezdilov	Ukraine	Israel	1996
Sergey Lukashok	Ukraine	Israel	
Mukat Derba	Ethiopia	Israel	
Konstantin Semyonov	Belarus	Israel	
Niels Kruller	Netherlands	Israel	1998
Alex Rosen	United States	Israel	1998
Aleksandr Averbukh	Russia	Israel	1999
Irina Lenskiy	Russia	Israel	1999
Aleksandr Porkhomovskiy	Russia	Israel	1999
Dan Middleman	United States	Israel	2000
Anna Tkach	Russia	Israel	2003
Niki Palli	Moldova	Israel	2005
Dustin Emrani	United States	Israel	2009
Jillian Schwartz	United States	Israel	2010
Girmaw Amare	Ethiopia	Israel	
Aimeru Almeya	Ethiopia	Israel	
Berihun Wuve	Ethiopia	Israel	
Korima Chemtai	Kenya	Israel	2016
Fiona May	Great Britain	Italy	1994
Rachid Berradi	Morocco	Italy	
Migidio Bourifa	Morocco	Italy	
Fatna Maraoui	Morocco	Italy	2003
Mostafa Errebbah	Morocco	Italy	2001
Magdelín Martínez	Cuba	Italy	2001
Libania Grenot	Cuba	Italy	2008
Fabé Dia	France	Italy	2009
Judit Varga	Hungary	Italy	2011
Gregory Bianchi	Switzerland	Italy	2011
Hassane Fofana	Ivory Coast	Italy	2011
Eseosa Desalu	Nigeria	Italy	2012
Lamont Marcell Jacobs	United States	Italy	2012
Jamel Chatbi	Morocco	Italy	2013
Dariya Derkach	Ukraine	Italy	2013
Gianni Frankis	Great Britain	Italy	2016
Antonio Infantino	Great Britain	Italy	2016
Yusneysi Santiusti	Cuba	Italy	2016
Ariana Hilborn	United States	Latvia	2015
Daniel Abenzoar-Foulé	France	Luxembourg	2001
Mirjam Hess	Switzerland	Luxembourg	2006
Kimberly Chinfatt	Canada	Luxembourg	2025
Stojan Manolev	Bulgaria	Republic of Macedonia	1998
Ilijan Manolev	Bulgaria	Republic of Macedonia	1998
Tanya Blake	Great Britain	Malta	2002
Kevin Moore	Australia	Malta	2011
Charlotte Wingfield	Great Britain	Malta	2015
Troy Douglas	Bermuda	Netherlands	1998
Sharon Jaklofsky	Australia	Netherlands	
Tekeye Gebreselassie	Ethiopia	Netherlands	1998
Miguel Janssen	Aruba	Netherlands	1998
Nadezhda Wijenberg	Russia	Netherlands	1999
Caimin Douglas	Netherlands Antilles	Netherlands	2002
Brian Mariano	Netherlands Antilles	Netherlands	2011
Churandy Martina	Netherlands Antilles	Netherlands	2011
Lornah Kiplagat	Kenya	Netherlands	2003
Saskia Triesschijn	Germany	Netherlands	2007
Sifan Hassan	Ethiopia	Netherlands	2013
Solomon Bockarie	Sierra Leone	Netherlands	2015
Elizeba Cherono	Kenya	Netherlands	2016
Fernando Ramírez	Dominican Republic	Norway	
Aham Okeke	Nigeria	Norway	
Katarina Sederholm	Finland	Norway	1998
Jaysuma Saidy Ndure	Gambia	Norway	2007
Amalie Iuel	Denmark	Norway	2015
Yared Shegumo	Ethiopia	Poland	2004
Maria Żodzik	Belarus	Poland	2024
Christophe Fernandes	France	Portugal	2003
Nelson Évora	Cape Verde	Portugal	2002
Naide Gomes	São Tomé and Príncipe	Portugal	2002
Francis Obikwelu	Nigeria	Portugal	2002
Yazaldes Nascimento	São Tomé and Príncipe	Portugal	2007
Roman Guliy	Ukraine	Portugal	2009
Vera Barbosa	Cape Verde	Portugal	2009
Tsanko Arnaudov	Bulgaria	Portugal	2010
Lorène Bazolo	Republic of the Congo	Portugal	2016
Agate de Sousa	São Tomé and Príncipe	Portugal	2024
Tatjana Pinto	Germany	Portugal	2025
Sergiu Ursu	Moldova	Romania	2003
Delvine Relin Meringor	Kenya	Romania	2024
Joan Chelimo	Kenya	Romania	2024
Stella Rutto	Kenya	Romania	2024
Natalya Tsyganova	Ukraine	Russia	1994
Tatyana Shikolenko	Belarus	Russia	1996
Lev Lobodin	Ukraine	Russia	1996
Lyudmila Dzigalova	Ukraine	Russia	1998
Andriy Nemchaninov	Ukraine	Russia	1998
Valentin Kulbatskiy	Ukraine	Russia	1998
Boris Kaveshnikov	Kyrgyzstan	Russia	2000
Vladimir Malyavin	Turkmenistan	Russia	
Oksana Yarygina	Uzbekistan	Russia	
Tatyana Polnova	Turkey	Russia	2002
Anton Savkin	Uzbekistan	Russia	2000
Vitaliy Sidorov	Ukraine	Russia	2000
Aleksey Kurdenko	Belarus	Russia	2001
Viktor Chistiakov	Australia	Russia	2007
Igor Alekseyev	Belarus	Russia	2008
Olga Chernogorova	Belarus	Russia	2008
Rashida Khayrudinova	Uzbekistan	Russia	2008
Ivan Lukyanov	Moldova	Russia	2014
Darko Radakovic	Bosnia and Herzegovina	Serbia	2014
Biljana Cvijanović	Bosnia and Herzegovina	Serbia	2014
Galina Cistjaková	Russia	Slovakia	
Dmitrij Vaľukevič	Belarus	Slovakia	2005
Britta Bilač	Germany	Slovenia	1992
Uros Zver	Netherlands	Slovenia	1998
Merlene Ottey	Jamaica	Slovenia	2002
Fabio Ruzzier	Italy	Slovenia	2002
Milos Sakic	FR Yugoslavia	Slovenia	2002
Marija Martinovic-Šestak	Serbia and Montenegro	Slovenia	2006
Yousef El Nasri	Morocco	Spain	
Frank Bicet	Cuba	Spain	
Sandra Myers	United States	Spain	1987
Marlene Estévez	Cuba	Spain	1998
Griselda González	Argentina	Spain	1998
Cora Olivero	Argentina	Spain	1998
Niurka Montalvo	Cuba	Spain	1999
Virginia Martínez	Cuba	Spain	1999
Norfalia Carabalí	Colombia	Spain	2000
Alice Matějková	Czech Republic	Spain	2000
Roberto Moya	Cuba	Spain	2001
Glory Alozie	Nigeria	Spain	2002
Aliuska López	Cuba	Spain	2003
Yesenia Centeno	Cuba	Spain	2003
Joan Lino Martínez	Cuba	Spain	2004
Olga Koungorova	Russia	Spain	2005
Juliet Itoya	Nigeria	Spain	
Ruth Ndoumbe	Nigeria	Spain	
Mohamed Elbendir	Mauritania	Spain	2006
Jackson Quiñónez	Ecuador	Spain	2006
Ayad Lamdassem	Morocco	Spain	2007
Luis Felipe Méliz	Cuba	Spain	2008
Frank Casañas	Cuba	Spain	2008
Alemayehu Bezabeh	Ethiopia	Spain	2008
Digna Luz Murillo	Colombia	Spain	2010
Abdelaziz Merzougui	Morocco	Spain	2010
Trihas Gebre	Ethiopia	Spain	2014
Yioser Toledo	Cuba	Spain	2014
Indira Torrero	Cuba	Spain	2014
Housame Eddine Benabbou	Morocco	Spain	2014
Yidiel Contreras	Cuba	Spain	2015
Nana Jacob	Italy	Spain	2015
Yulenmis Aguilar	Cuba	Spain	2024
Josué Canales	Honduras	Spain	2024
Jordan Díaz	Cuba	Spain	2024
Kawtar Boulaid	Morocco	Spain	2025
Ludmila Engquist	Russia	Sweden	1996
Alhaji Jeng	Gambia	Sweden	1999
Mustafa Mohamed	Somalia	Sweden	
Alfred Shemweta	Tanzania	Sweden	1998
Nil de Oliveira	Brazil	Sweden	2010
Abeba Aregawi	Ethiopia	Sweden	2013
Meraf Bahta	Eritrea	Sweden	2014
Daniel Woldu	Eritrea	Sweden	2014
Robel Tsiha	Eritrea	Sweden	2018
Mia Barnett	United States	Sweden	2025
Helen Barnett-Burkart	United Kingdom	Switzerland	
Julie Baumann	Canada	Switzerland	1991
Nelly Sébastien	France	Switzerland	1998
Chantal Dallenbach	France	Switzerland	2000
Alexander Martínez	Cuba	Switzerland	2006
Ali Hakimi	Tunisia	Switzerland	2007/2010
Alex Wilson	Jamaica	Switzerland	2010
Brahian Peña	Dominican Republic	Switzerland	2012
Tadesse Abraham	Eritrea	Switzerland	2014
Dominic Lokinyomo Lobalu	South Sudan	Switzerland	2024
Metin Durmuşoğlu	Bulgaria	Turkey	1998
Tatyana Polnova	Russia	Turkey	1998
Oksana Andrusina-Mert	Russia	Turkey	1998
Sibel Özyurt	Ethiopia	Turkey	1998
Nuray Tizita Sürekli	Ethiopia	Turkey	1998
Metin Sazak	Turkmenistan	Turkey	1998
Nora Ivanova-Güner	Bulgaria	Turkey	1999
Svetla Mitkova-Sınırtaş	Bulgaria	Turkey	1999
Elvan Abeylegesse	Ethiopia	Turkey	1999
Anzhela Atroshchenko	Belarus	Turkey	1999
Ebru Kavaklıoğlu	Russia	Turkey	1999
Mirela Dulgheru-Renda	Romania	Turkey	1999
Aysen Barak	Russia	Turkey	2000
Svetlana Kanatova Kandemir	Russia	Turkey	2004
Selim Bayrak	Ethiopia	Turkey	2008
Sultan Haydar	Ethiopia	Turkey	2008
Karin Melis Mey	South Africa	Turkey	2008
Alemitu Bekele	Ethiopia	Turkey	2009
İlham Tanui Özbilen	Kenya	Turkey	2011
Ramil Guliyev	Azerbaijan	Turkey	2013
Tarık Langat Akdağ	Kenya	Turkey	2013
Ali Kaya	Kenya	Turkey	2013
İrfan Yıldırım	Ukraine	Turkey	2013
Şeref Osmanoğlu	Ukraine	Turkey	2013
Yasmani Copello Escobar	Cuba	Turkey	2014
Jak Ali Harvey	Jamaica	Turkey	2015
Meryem Akda	Kenya	Turkey	2015
Yasemin Can	Kenya	Turkey	2016
Yunier Pérez	Cuba	Turkey	2017
Polat Kemboi Arıkan	Kenya	Turkey	

== To countries in Oceania ==
Name of athlete	From nation	To nation	Year	Source
Youcef Abdi	Algeria	Australia	2000	R11
Jackie Areson	United States	Australia	2013	R13
Sisay Bezabeh	Ethiopia	Australia	2000	R11
Viktor Chistiakov	Russia	Australia	1999	R11
Daniela Costian	Romania	Australia	1990	
Ambrose Ezenwa	Nigeria	Australia	2006	R11
Daniel Golubovic	United States	Australia	2020	R20
Tatiana Grigorieva	Russia	Australia	1998	R11
Zid Abou Hamed	Syria	Australia	1997	
Hans Lotz	Germany	Australia	1982	
Dmitri Markov	Belarus	Australia	1999	R11
Mizan Mehari	Ethiopia	Australia	1999	R11
Peter O'Donoghue	New Zealand	Australia	1991	
Eddie Osei-Nketia	New Zealand	Australia	2025	R25
Silvana Trampuz	Italy	Australia		
Tania Van Heer	Sri Lanka	Australia	1987	
Gemechu Woyecha	Qatar	Australia	2002 ?	
Benjamin Ashkettle	New Zealand	Fiji	2019	R19
Tumatai Dauphin	France	French Polynesia	2019	R19
Benjamin Ashkettle	Australia	New Zealand	2014	R14
Anna Brzezińska	Poland	New Zealand	1999	R11
Gus Nketia	Ghana	New Zealand	1992	R11
Denis Petushinskiy	Russia	New Zealand	1998	R11
Biljana Petrovich	FR Yugoslavia	New Zealand	1998	R11
Jeremy Dodson	United States	Samoa	2014	R15
Emanuele Fuamatu	Australia	Samoa	2009	R11
Alex Rose	United States	Samoa	2011	R11
Nainoa Soto Thompson	American Samoa	Samoa	2023	R23
Nuuausala Tuilefano	American Samoa	Samoa	2023	R23

== See also ==
- List of sportspeople who competed for more than one nation
- Naturalized athletes of Italy
