= Israel at the 2001 World Championships in Athletics =

Israel's competition at the 2001 World Championships of Athletics

- WA code: ISR
- Website: www.iaa.co.il

in Edmonton
- Competitors: 10 in 7 events
- Medals: Gold 0 Silver 1 Bronze 0 Total 1

World Championships in Athletics appearances (overview)
- 1976; 1980; 1983; 1987; 1991; 1993; 1995; 1997; 1999; 2001; 2003; 2005; 2007; 2009; 2011; 2013; 2015; 2017; 2019; 2022; 2023; 2025

Israel competed at the 2001 World Championships in Athletics from 3 August to 12 August in Edmonton, Alberta, Canada.

== Medalists ==
The following competitors from Israel won medals at the Championships

Medal	Athlete	Event
Silver	Aleksandr Averbukh	Pole vault

== Men's pole vault ==
=== Qualification - Group A ===
7 August

Rank	Name	5.30	5.50	5.60	5.70	Result	Notes
7	Aleksandr Averbukh (ISR)	-	o	xo	xxo	5.70	

=== Final ===
9 August

Rank	Name	5.50	5.65	5.75	5.85	5.90	5.95	6.05	6.10	Result	Notes
Silver medal	Aleksandr Averbukh (ISR)	-	xo	o	o	x-	xx			5.85	

== Men's 100 metres ==
=== Heats ===
RANK	HEAT 11	TIME
3.	Aleksandr Porkhomovskiy (ISR)	10.42

=== Quarterfinals ===
RANK	HEAT 1	TIME
7.	Aleksandr Porkhomovskiy (ISR)	10.28

== Men's 4 × 100 metres relay ==
=== Heats ===
Rank	Nation	Athletes	Time
4.	Israel (ISR)	• Kfir Golan • Tommy Kafri • Gideon Yablonka • Aleksandr Porkhomovskiy	39.13

=== Semifinals ===
Rank	Nation	Athletes	Time
7.	Israel (ISR)	• Kfir Golan • Tommy Kafri • Gideon Yablonka • Aleksandr Porkhomovskiy	39.39

== Men's marathon ==
=== Intermediates ===
Rank	Number	Athlete	Time
5 KILOMETRES
4	572	Asaf Bimro (ISR)	15:51

=== Final ranking ===
Rank	Athlete	Time
20	Asaf Bimro (ISR)	2:22:36

== Women's 100 metres hurdles ==
=== Heats ===
Rank	Heat	Name	Nationality	Time
20	4	Irina Lenskiy	Israel	13.20
24	2	Svetlana Gnedzdilov	Israel	13.28

== Men's triple jump ==
=== Qualification ===
Rank	Group	Athlete	Nationality	#1	#2	#3	Result
22	A	Avi Tayari	Israel	14.80	16.06	15.78	16.06

== Men's javelin throw ==
=== Qualification - Group A ===
Rank	Overall	Athlete	Attempts			Distance
Rank	Overall	Athlete	1	2	3	Distance
12	22	Vadim Bavikin (ISR)	77.91	X	71.59	77.91 m
