= Israel at the 2003 World Championships in Athletics =

Israel's competition at the 2003 World Championships of Athletics

- WA code: ISR
- Website: www.iaa.co.il

in Paris
- Competitors: 8 in 7 events
- Medals: Gold 0 Silver 0 Bronze 0 Total 0

World Championships in Athletics appearances (overview)
- 1976; 1980; 1983; 1987; 1991; 1993; 1995; 1997; 1999; 2001; 2003; 2005; 2007; 2009; 2011; 2013; 2015; 2017; 2019; 2022; 2023; 2025

This is a record of Israel at the 2003 World Championships in Athletics.

== Women's 400 metres ==
=== Heats ===
RANK	HEAT 2	TIME
5.	Anna Tkach (ISR)	52.06 (NR)

=== Semifinals ===
RANK	HEAT 3	TIME
7.	Anna Tkach (ISR)	52.25

== Women's 100 metres hurdles ==
=== Heats ===
RANK	HEAT 5	TIME
2.	Irina Lenskiy (ISR)	12.92

=== Semifinals ===
RANK	HEAT 3	TIME
4.	Irina Lenskiy (ISR)	12.89

== Women's 4 × 400 metres relay ==
=== Heat 3 ===
RANK	NATION	ATHLETES	TIME
7.	Israel (ISR)	• Irina Lenskiy • Svetlana Gnezdilov • Anat Morad • Anna Tkach	3:32.99 (NR)

== Men's marathon ==
Rank	Athlete	Time	Note
27	Asaf Bimro (ISR)	2:14:52	NR
—	Haile Satayin (ISR)	DNF	

== Men's pole vault ==
=== Qualification ===
Rank	Group	Name	Nationality	5.20	5.35	5.50	5.60	5.70	Result	Notes
	A	Aleksandr Averbukh	Israel	-	-	-	xxx		NM	

== Men's javelin throw ==
=== Qualification - Group B ===
Rank	Overall	Athlete	Throws			Result	Note
Rank	Overall	Athlete	1	2	3	Result	Note
6	13	Vadim Bavikin (ISR)	71.77	77.06	X	77.06 m	

== Women's heptathlon ==
Rank	Athlete	Points	100h	HJ	SP	200	LJ	JT	800
	Svetlana Gnezdilov (ISR)	DNF	13.62	1.55	11.36	DNS			
