= Israel at the 2005 World Championships in Athletics =

Israel's competition at the 2005 World Championships of Athletics

- WA code: ISR
- Website: www.iaa.co.il

in Helsinki
- Competitors: 5 in 3 events
- Medals: Gold 0 Silver 0 Bronze 0 Total 0

World Championships in Athletics appearances (overview)
- 1976; 1980; 1983; 1987; 1991; 1993; 1995; 1997; 1999; 2001; 2003; 2005; 2007; 2009; 2011; 2013; 2015; 2017; 2019; 2022; 2023; 2025

This is a record of Israel at the 2005 World Championships in Athletics.

== Men's marathon ==
Rank	Athlete	Time	Note
21	Haile Satayin	2:17:26	SB
37	Wodage Zvadya	2:21:57	SB
47	Asaf Bimro	2:23:58	

== Women's marathon ==
Rank	Athlete	Time	Note
49	Nili Abramski (ISR)	2:54:08	

== Men's javelin throw ==
=== Qualification - Group B ===
Rank	Overall	Athlete	Attempts			Result	Note
Rank	Overall	Athlete	1	2	3	Result	Note
14	28	Vadim Bavikin (ISR)	66.03	66.74	X	66.74 m	
