= Israel at the 2010 European Athletics Championships =

Sporting event delegation

Israel was represented by 16 athletes at the 2010 European Athletics Championships held in Barcelona, Spain.

== Participants ==
| Event | Men | Women |
|---|---|---|
| 100 m | Dmitriy Glushchenko | |
| 200 m | Dmitriy Glushchenko | |
| 800 m | Dastein Amrany | |
| 5000 m | Gezachw Yossef | |
| 10000 m | Moges Tesseme | |
| 100 m hurdles | | Irina Lenskiy |
| Marathon | Asaf Bimro; Ayele Setegne; Dastaho Svnech; Brihun Weve; Zohar Zimro; Wodage Zwadya | |
| High Jump | | Danielle Frenkel; Ma'ayan Fureman |
| Pole Vault | Brian Mondschein; Yevgeniy Olkhovskiy | |
| Long Jump | Yochai Halevi | |
| Triple Jump | Yochai Halevi | |

== Results ==
| 2010 Barcelona | Gold | Silver | Bronze | Total |
| Israel (ISR) | 0 | 0 | 0 | 0 |

=== Men ===
Track and road events

| Event | Athletes | Heats | | Semifinal | | Final | |
| Event | Athletes | Result | Rank | Result | Rank | Result | Rank |
|---|---|---|---|---|---|---|---|
| 100 m | Dmitriy Glushchenko | 10.44 SB | 16 q | 10.50 | 17 | did not advance | |
| 200 m | Dmitriy Glushchenko | 21.09 | 23 | did not advance | | | |
| 800 m | Dastein Amrany | 1:51.51 | 22 | did not advance | | | |
| 5000 m | Gezachw Yossef | 13:55.97 | 20 | did not advance | | | |
| 10000 m | Moges Tesseme | | | | | 29:50.78 | 20 |
| Marathon | Asaf Bimro | | | | | | |
| Marathon | Ayele Setegne | | | | | | |
| Marathon | Dastaho Svnech | | | | | | |
| Marathon | Brihun Weve | | | | | | |
| Marathon | Zohar Zemiro | | | | | | |
| Marathon | Wodage Zwadya | | | | | | |

Field events

| Event | Athletes | Qualification | | Final | |
| Event | Athletes | Result | Rank | Result | Rank |
|---|---|---|---|---|---|
| Long jump | Yochai Halevi | 7.90 | 18 | did not advance | |
| Triple jump | Yochai Halevi | 16.76 PB | 14 Q | 16.43 | 11 |
| Pole Vault | Brian Mondschein | 5.30 | 23 | did not advance | |
| Pole Vault | Yevgeniy Olkhovskiy | 5.30 | 24 | did not advance | |

=== Women ===
Track and road events

| Event | Athletes | Heats | | Semifinal | | Final | |
| Event | Athletes | Result | Rank | Result | Rank | Result | Rank |
|---|---|---|---|---|---|---|---|
| 100 m hurdles | Irina Lenskiy | 13.41 | 23 | did not advance | | | |

Field events

| Event | Athletes | Qualification | | Final | |
| Event | Athletes | Result | Rank | Result | Rank |
|---|---|---|---|---|---|
| High jump | Danielle Frenkel | 1.92 NR | 1 | 1.85 | 12 |
| High jump | Ma'ayan Fureman | 1.78 | 26 | did not advance | |
