= Israel at the 2022 World Athletics Championships =

- Flag of Israel
- WA code: ISR
- National federation: Israeli Athletic Association
- Website: www.iaa.co.il

in Eugene, United States 15 July 2022 – 24 July 2022
- Competitors: 10 (4 men and 6 women) in 7 events
- Medals Ranked 40th: Gold 0 Silver 0 Bronze 1 Total 1

World Athletics Championships appearances (overview)
- 1976; 1980; 1983; 1987; 1991; 1993; 1995; 1997; 1999; 2001; 2003; 2005; 2007; 2009; 2011; 2013; 2015; 2017; 2019; 2022; 2023; 2025

Israel competed at the 2022 World Athletics Championships held in Eugene, Oregon, USA from 15 to 24 July 2022. The Israeli Athletic Association entered 10 athletes.

On 18 July 2022, Kenyan-born Israeli runner Lonah Chemtai Salpeter won the bronze medal in the women's marathon to give Israel its fourth medal in the overall history of the World Athletics Championships.

== Medalists ==
Medal	Athlete	Event	Date
Bronze	Lonah Chemtai Salpeter	Women's marathon	18 July

== Team ==
The Israeli team consisted of 10 athletes (6 women and 4 men), the second largest number of Israeli athletes that ever went the World Athletics Championships, just behind Seville 1999 when Israel qualified 11 athletes.

== Results ==
Israel entered 10 athletes.

Key

- Note: Ranks given for track events are within the athlete's heat only
- Q = Qualified for the next round
- q = Qualified for the next round as a fastest loser or, in field events, by position without achieving the qualifying target
- NR = National record
- PB = Personal best
- SB = Season best
- N/A = Round not applicable for the event

=== Men ===
Track events

Athlete	Event	Final	
Athlete	Event	Result	Rank
Haimro Almaya	Marathon	2:17:05	48
Tesama Moogas	Marathon	2:11:36	25
Maru Teferi	Marathon	2:07:59	11

Field events

Athlete	Event	Qualification		Final	
Athlete	Event	Distance	Position	Distance	Position
Yonathan Kapitolnik	High jump	2.28	8 q	2.24	11

=== Women ===
Track and road events

Athlete	Event	Heat		Semi-final		Final	
Athlete	Event	Result	Rank	Result	Rank	Result	Rank
Diana Vaisman	100 metres	11.29 (+0.2)	5	Did not advance			
Selamawit Teferi	5000 metres	15:44.30 SB	14	—N/a		Did not advance	
Lonah Chemtai Salpeter	Marathon	—N/a				2:20:18	3rd place, bronze medalist(s)
Maor Tiyouri	Marathon	—N/a				2:31:54	23
Adva Cohen	3000 metres steeplechase	9:44.74	12	Did not advance			

Field events

Athlete	Event	Qualification		Final	
Athlete	Event	Distance	Position	Distance	Position
Hanna Minenko	Triple jump	14.11	15	Did not advance	
