= Israel at the 1995 World Championships in Athletics =

Israel's competition at the 1995 World Championships of Athletics

- WA code: ISR
- Website: www.iaa.co.il

in Gothenburg
- Competitors: 8 in 8 events
- Medals: Gold 0 Silver 0 Bronze 0 Total 0

World Championships in Athletics appearances (overview)
- 1976; 1980; 1983; 1987; 1991; 1993; 1995; 1997; 1999; 2001; 2003; 2005; 2007; 2009; 2011; 2013; 2015; 2017; 2019; 2022; 2023; 2025

This is a record of Israel at the 1995 World Championships in Athletics.

== Men's 100 metres ==
=== Qualifying heats ===
RANK	HEAT 9	TIME
6.	Kfir Golan (ISR)	10.71

== Men's marathon ==
Rank	Athlete	Time	Note
—	Asaf Bimro (ISR)	DNF	

== Men's 20 kilometres walk ==
Rank	Athlete	Time	Note
—	Vladimir Ostrovskiy (ISR)	DNF	

== Men's triple jump ==
=== Qualifying round ===
RANK	GROUP A	DISTANCE
4.	Rogel Nachum (ISR)	16.71 m

=== Final round ===
RANK	FINAL RANKING	DISTANCE
11	Rogel Nachum (ISR)	16.69 m

== Men's high jump ==
=== Qualifying round ===
RANK	Group B	HEIGHT
12.	Konstantin Matusevich (ISR)	2.24 m

== Men's pole vault ==
=== Qualifying round ===
RANK	GROUP A	HEIGHT
—	Konstantin Semyonov (ISR)	NM

== Men's discus throw ==
=== Qualifying round ===
RANK	GROUP A	DISTANCE
19.	Sergey Lukashok (ISR)	54.90 m

== Men's javelin throw ==
=== Qualifying round - Group A ===
Rank	Overall	Athlete	Attempts			Distance
Rank	Overall	Athlete	1	2	3	Distance
16	31	Aleksandr Fingert (ISR)	68.30	66.46	70.94	70.94 m
