= Israel at the 1997 World Championships in Athletics =

Israel's competition at the 1997 World Championships of Athletics

- WA code: ISR
- Website: www.iaa.co.il

in Athens
- Competitors: 6 in 6 events
- Medals: Gold 0 Silver 0 Bronze 0 Total 0

World Championships in Athletics appearances (overview)
- 1976; 1980; 1983; 1987; 1991; 1993; 1995; 1997; 1999; 2001; 2003; 2005; 2007; 2009; 2011; 2013; 2015; 2017; 2019; 2022; 2023; 2025

This is a record of Israel at the 1997 World Championships in Athletics.

== Men's 100 metres ==
=== Heats ===
Rank	Heat	Name	Nationality	Time	Notes
73	2	Tommy Kafri	Israel	10.64	

== Men's marathon ==
Rank	Athlete	Time	Note
59	Asaf Bimro (ISR)	2:37:45	

== Men's triple jump ==
=== Qualifying round ===
RANK	GROUP A	DISTANCE
13.	Avi Tayari (ISR)	16.45 m

== Men's high jump ==
=== Qualifying round ===
Group	Rank	Name	Result	Notes
B	5.	Konstantin Matusevich (ISR)	2.28 Q	

=== Final round ===
Rank	Name	Result	Notes
7	Konstantin Matusevich (ISR)	2.29	

== Men's pole vault ==
=== Qualification - Group A ===
Rank	Name	5.30	5.45	5.60	5.70	Result	Notes
7	Danny Krasnov (ISR)	-	xo	o	xxo	5.70	q

=== Final round ===
Rank	Name	5.50	5.70	5.80	5.86	5.91	5.96	6.01	6.06	6.15	Result	Notes
9	Danny Krasnov (ISR)	o	xxx								5.50	

== Men's javelin throw ==
=== Qualification - Group A ===
Rank	Overall	Athlete	Attempts			Distance
Rank	Overall	Athlete	1	2	3	Distance
17	33	Aleksandr Fingert (ISR)	69.74	69.20	68.56	69.74 m
