= Israel at the 2025 World Athletics Championships =

- Flag of Israel
- WA code: ISR

in Tokyo, Japan 13 September 2025 – 21 September 2025
- Competitors: 8 (5 men and 3 women)
- Medals: Gold 0 Silver 0 Bronze 0 Total 0

World Athletics Championships appearances (overview)
- 1976; 1980; 1983; 1987; 1991; 1993; 1995; 1997; 1999; 2001; 2003; 2005; 2007; 2009; 2011; 2013; 2015; 2017; 2019; 2022; 2023; 2025

Israel competed at the 2025 World Athletics Championships in Tokyo, Japan, from 13 to 21 September 2025.

== Results ==
Israel entered 8 athletes to the championships: 3 women and 5 men.

Key

- Q = Qualified for the next round
- q = Qualified for the next round as a fastest loser or, in field events, by position without achieving the qualifying target
- NR = National record
- PB = Personal best
- SB = Season best
- N/A = Round not applicable for the event

=== Men ===
Track and road events

Athlete	Event	Heat		Semifinal		Final	
Athlete	Event	Result	Rank	Result	Rank	Result	Rank
Blessing Akwasi Afrifah	200 metres	20.47	4	Did not advance			
Haimro Alame	Marathon	—N/a				2:10:03	4
Gashau Ayale	Marathon	—N/a				2:10:27	7
Maru Teferi	Marathon	—N/a				DNF	

Field events

Athlete	Event	Qualification		Final	
Athlete	Event	Distance	Position	Distance	Position
Yonathan Kapitolnik	High jump	2.21	14	Did not advance	

=== Women ===
Track and road events

Athlete	Event	Heat		Semifinal		Final	
Athlete	Event	Result	Rank	Result	Rank	Result	Rank
Adva Cohen	3000 metres steeplechase	9:19.90 NR	6	—N/a		Did not advance	
Lonah Chemtaii Salpeter	Marathon	—N/a				DNF	
Maor Tiyouri	Marathon	—N/a				2:34:28	23
