= Israel at the 2007 World Championships in Athletics =

Israel's competition at the 2007 World Championships of Athletics

- WA code: ISR
- Website: www.iaa.co.il

in Osaka
- Competitors: 7 in 4 events
- Medals: Gold 0 Silver 0 Bronze 0 Total 0

World Championships in Athletics appearances (overview)
- 1976; 1980; 1983; 1987; 1991; 1993; 1995; 1997; 1999; 2001; 2003; 2005; 2007; 2009; 2011; 2013; 2015; 2017; 2019; 2022; 2023; 2025

Israel sent 7 competitors to the 2007 World Championships in Athletics.

== Men's 3000 metres steeplechase ==
=== Heats ===
Rank	Heat	Name	Time	Notes
30	2	Itai Maggidi	8:43.00	

== Men's marathon ==
=== Final rankings ===
Rank	Athlete	Time	Note
19	Seteng Ayele	2:22:27	
34	Wodage Zvadya	2:29:21	
40	Asaf Bimro	2:31:34	

=== Marathon World Cup ===
Place	Athletes	Time
7	Ayele Seteng; Wodage Zvadya; Asaf Bimro; Total	2:22:27; 2:29:21; 2:31:34; 7:23:22

== Women's marathon ==
Place	Athlete	Time	Notes
41	Nili Abramski	2:46:27	

== Men's high jump ==
=== Qualification - Group A ===
Place	Athlete	Mark	Notes
16	Niki Palli	2.19	

== Men's pole vault ==
=== Qualification - Group B ===
Place	Athlete	Mark	Notes
4	Aleksandr Averbukh	5.65	q

=== Finals ===
Place	Athlete	Mark	Notes
7	Aleksandr Averbukh	5.81	SB
