= Israel at the 1999 World Championships in Athletics =

Israel's competition at the 1999 World Championships of Athletics

- WA code: ISR
- Website: www.iaa.co.il

in Sevilla
- Competitors: 10 in 8 events
- Medals: Gold 0 Silver 0 Bronze 1 Total 1

World Championships in Athletics appearances (overview)
- 1976; 1980; 1983; 1987; 1991; 1993; 1995; 1997; 1999; 2001; 2003; 2005; 2007; 2009; 2011; 2013; 2015; 2017; 2019; 2022; 2023; 2025

Israel competed at the 1999 World Championships in Athletics from 20 August and 29 August in Seville, Spain.

== Medalists ==
The following competitors from Israel won medals at the Championships.

Medal	Athlete	Event
Bronze	Aleksandr Averbukh	Pole vault

== Men's pole vault ==
=== Qualification ===
Rank	Group	Name	5.40	5.55	5.65	5.70	5.75	Result	Notes
10	B	Aleksandr Averbukh (ISR)	-	o	o	-	x	5.65	q
12	B	Danny Krasnov (ISR)	-	o	xxo	-	x	5.65	q

=== Final ===
Rank	Name	5.50	5.70	5.80	5.90	5.96	6.02	6.07	Result	Notes
Bronze medal	Aleksandr Averbukh (ISR)	-	xo	xo	xxx				5.80	NR
9	Danny Krasnov (ISR)	o	xxx						5.50	

== Men's 100 meters ==
=== Heats ===
RANK	HEAT 6	TIME
3.	Aleksandr Porkhomovskiy (ISR)	10.42

RANK	HEAT 7	TIME
4.	Tommy Kafri (ISR)	10.38

=== Quarterfinals ===
RANK	HEAT 2	TIME
8.	Tommy Kafri (ISR)	10.36

RANK	HEAT 3	TIME
5.	Aleksandr Porkhomovskiy (ISR)	10.20 (NR)

== Men's 200 meters ==
=== Heats ===
RANK	HEAT 4	TIME
5.	Tommy Kafri (ISR)	20.89 (NR)

== Men's 4 × 100 metres relay ==
=== Heats ===
RANK	HEAT 4	TIME
3.	Israel; Rafel Yaar; Gideon Jablonka; Tommy Kafri; Aleksandr Porkhomovskiy	38.81 (NR)

== Women's 100 metres hurdles ==
=== Heats ===
RANK	HEAT 3	TIME
7.	Svetlana Gendzilov (ISR)	13.47

== Women's 400 metres hurdles ==
=== Heats ===
RANK	HEAT 2	TIME
7.	Olga Dor-Dogadedko (ISR)	57.23

== Men's marathon ==
Rank	Athlete	Time
55	Zvade Vodage (ISR)	2:36:19

== Men's triple jump ==
=== Qualification ===
RANK	GROUP B	DISTANCE
10.	Konstantin Matusevich (ISR)	2.20 m
