= Israel at the 2013 World Championships in Athletics =

Israel's competition at the 2013 World Championships of Athletics

- WA code: ISR
- Website: www.iaa.co.il

in Moscow
- Competitors: 3 in 3 events
- Medals: Gold 0 Silver 0 Bronze 0 Total 0

World Championships in Athletics appearances (overview)
- 1976; 1980; 1983; 1987; 1991; 1993; 1995; 1997; 1999; 2001; 2003; 2005; 2007; 2009; 2011; 2013; 2015; 2017; 2019; 2022; 2023; 2025

Israel is competing at the 2013 World Championships in Athletics in Moscow, Russia, from 10–18 August 2013. A team of 3 athletes represents the country in the event.

== Results ==
(q – qualified, NM – no mark, SB – season best)

=== Men ===
Athlete	Event	Preliminaries		Final	
Athlete	Event	Time/Mark	Rank	Time/Mark	Rank
Zohar Zemiro	Marathon	-	-	2:25:23	40

=== Women ===
Athlete	Event	Preliminaries		Final	
Athlete	Event	Time/Mark	Rank	Time/Mark	Rank
Maayan Furman-Shahaf	High Jump	1.88	16	Did not advance	
Hanna Knyazyeva-Minenko	Triple Jump	14.46	3	14.33	6
