= Israel at the 2009 World Championships in Athletics =

Israel's competition at the 2009 World Championships of Athletics

- WA code: ISR
- Website: www.iaa.co.il

in Berlin
- Competitors: 4 in 5 events
- Medals: Gold 0 Silver 0 Bronze 0 Total 0

World Championships in Athletics appearances (overview)
- 1976; 1980; 1983; 1987; 1991; 1993; 1995; 1997; 1999; 2001; 2003; 2005; 2007; 2009; 2011; 2013; 2015; 2017; 2019; 2022; 2023; 2025

Israel competed at the 2009 World Championships in Athletics, which took place from 15 to 23 August. 4 athletes have been able to achieve the qualifying standards: Yochai Halevi in the men's triple jump, Irina Lenskiy in the women's 100 m hurdles, Yevgeniy Olkhovskiy in the men's pole vault and Wodage Zvadya in the men's marathon. After missing the call to leave the training grounds, Yochai Halevi was denied entry to the men's triple jump qualification. An appeal by the Israeli delegation was accepted by the organizing committee, and despite Halevi had not achieved the qualifying standards, he competed in the men's long jump.

== Results ==
Track and road events

Event		Athletes	Heat Round 1		Semifinal		Final	
Event		Athletes	Result	Rank	Result	Rank	Result	Rank
Men	Marathon	Wodage Zvadya					2:34:58	64
Women	100 m hurdles	Irina Lenskiy	13.18	4	13.29	8	Did not qualify	

Field and combined events

Event		Athletes	Qualification		Final	
Event		Athletes	Result	Rank	Result	Rank
Men	Triple jump	Yochai Halevi	Did not start		Did not qualify	
Men	Long jump	Yochai Halevi	7.42m	42	Did not qualify	
Men	Pole vault	Yevgeniy Olkhovskiy	5.40m	26	Did not qualify	
