= Israel at the 1993 World Championships in Athletics =

Israel's competition at the 1993 World Championships of Athletics

- WA code: ISR
- Website: www.iaa.co.il

in Stuttgart
- Competitors: 7 in 7 events
- Medals: Gold 0 Silver 0 Bronze 0 Total 0

World Championships in Athletics appearances (overview)
- 1976; 1980; 1983; 1987; 1991; 1993; 1995; 1997; 1999; 2001; 2003; 2005; 2007; 2009; 2011; 2013; 2015; 2017; 2019; 2022; 2023; 2025

This is a record of Israel at the 1993 World Championships in Athletics.

== Men's 400 metres hurdles ==
=== Qualifying heats ===
RANK	HEAT 4 — 11.54h	TIME
5.	Aleksey Bazarov (ISR)	50.08

== Men's 20 kilometres walk ==
Rank	Athlete	Time	Note
33	Vladimir Ostrovskiy (ISR)	1:35:41	

== Men's triple jump ==
=== Qualifying round ===
RANK	GROUP A	DISTANCE
7.	Rogel Nachum (ISR)	16.86 m

== Men's high jump ==
=== Qualifying round ===
RANK	GROUP B	HEIGHT
13.	Itai Margalit (ISR)	2.20 m

== Men's pole vault ==
=== Qualifying round ===
RANK	GROUP B	HEIGHT
10.	Danny Krasnov (ISR)	5.55 m

== Men's discus throw ==
=== Qualifying round ===
RANK	GROUP B	DISTANCE
8.	Sergey Lukashok (ISR)	60.88 m

== Men's javelin throw ==
=== Qualifying round - Group B ===
Rank	Overall	Athlete	Attempts			Distance
Rank	Overall	Athlete	1	2	3	Distance
10	16	Vadim Bavikin (ISR)	73.30	X	76.98	76.98 m
