= Israel at the 1991 World Championships in Athletics =

Israel's competition at the 1991 World Championships of Athletics

- WA code: ISR
- Website: www.iaa.co.il

in Tokyo
- Competitors: 5 in 6 events
- Medals: Gold 0 Silver 0 Bronze 0 Total 0

World Championships in Athletics appearances (overview)
- 1976; 1980; 1983; 1987; 1991; 1993; 1995; 1997; 1999; 2001; 2003; 2005; 2007; 2009; 2011; 2013; 2015; 2017; 2019; 2022; 2023; 2025

This is a record of Israel at the 1991 World Championships in Athletics.

== Women's 200 metres ==
=== Qualifying heats ===
RANK	HEAT 5	TIME
4.	Orit Kolodni (ISR)	23.78

=== Quarterfinals ===
RANK	HEAT 1	TIME
5.	Orit Kolodni (ISR)	23.61

=== Semifinals ===
RANK	HEAT 2	TIME
8	Orit Kolodni (ISR)	24.27

== Women's 400 metres ==
=== Qualifying heats ===
RANK	HEAT 1	TIME
6.	Orit Kolodni (ISR)	54.26

== Men's 20 kilometres walk ==
RANK	FINAL	TIME
23.	Vladimir Ostrovskiy (ISR)	1:24:35

== Men's triple jump ==
=== Qualifying round ===
RANK	GROUP B	DISTANCE
15.	Rogel Nachum (ISR)	15.90 m

== Men's discus throw ==
RANK	GROUP B	DISTANCE
30.	Igor Avrunin (ISR)	56.74 m

== Men's javelin throw ==
=== Qualifying round - Group B ===
Rank	Overall	Athlete	Attempts			Distance
Rank	Overall	Athlete	1	2	3	Distance
6	8	Vadim Bavikin (ISR)	78.68	81.56	X	81.56 m

=== Final round ===
Rank	Athlete	Attempts						Distance	Note
Rank	Athlete	1	2	3	4	5	6	Distance	Note
10	Vadim Bavikin (ISR)	77.18	X	68.98				77.18 m	
