= Israel at the 2011 World Championships in Athletics =

Israel's competition at the 2011 World Championships of Athletics

- WA code: ISR
- Website: www.iaa.co.il

in Daegu
- Competitors: 4 in 4 events
- Medals: Gold 0 Silver 0 Bronze 0 Total 0

World Championships in Athletics appearances (overview)
- 1976; 1980; 1983; 1987; 1991; 1993; 1995; 1997; 1999; 2001; 2003; 2005; 2007; 2009; 2011; 2013; 2015; 2017; 2019; 2022; 2023; 2025

Israel competed at the 2011 World Championships in Athletics from August 27 to September 5 in Daegu, South Korea.

== Team selection ==
A team of 5 athletes was announced to represent the country in the event.

The following athletes appeared on the preliminary Entry List, but not on the Official Start List of the specific event, resulting in a total number of 4 competitors:

KEY:	Did not participate	Competed in another event

	Event	Athlete
Women	High jump	Ma'ayan Foreman

== Results ==
=== Men ===
Athlete	Event	Preliminaries		Final	
Athlete	Event	Time Height	Rank	Time Height	Rank
Zohar Zemiro	Marathon			DNF	
Dmitriy Kroyter	High jump	2.16m	31	Did not advance	

=== Women ===
Athlete	Event	Preliminaries		Final	
Athlete	Event	Height	Rank	Height	Rank
Danielle Frenkel	High jump	1.85m	24	Did not advance	
Jillian Schwartz	Pole vault	4.25m	25	Did not advance	
