= Israel at the 1987 World Championships in Athletics =

Israel's competition at the 1987 World Championships of Athletics

- WA code: ISR
- Website: www.iaa.co.il

in Rome
- Competitors: 2 in 2 events
- Medals: Gold 0 Silver 0 Bronze 0 Total 0

World Championships in Athletics appearances (overview)
- 1976; 1980; 1983; 1987; 1991; 1993; 1995; 1997; 1999; 2001; 2003; 2005; 2007; 2009; 2011; 2013; 2015; 2017; 2019; 2022; 2023; 2025

This is a record of Israel at the 1987 World Championships in Athletics.

== Men's 400 metres hurdles ==
=== Qualifying heats ===
RANK	HEAT 3	TIME
8	Ilan Goldwasser (ISR)	52.54

== Women's long jump ==
=== Qualifying round - Pool 2 ===
Rank	Name	Result	Notes
14	Sigal Gonen (ISR)	6.03	
