= Israel at the 2019 World Athletics Championships =

Israel's competition at the 2019 World Athletics Championships

Israel at the 2019 World Championships in Athletics
- WA code: ISR
- Website: www.iaa.co.il

in Doha
- Competitors: 3 in 3 events
- Medals: Gold 0 Silver 0 Bronze 0 Total 0

World Championships in Athletics appearances (overview)
- 1976; 1980; 1983; 1987; 1991; 1993; 1995; 1997; 1999; 2001; 2003; 2005; 2007; 2009; 2011; 2013; 2015; 2017; 2019; 2022; 2023; 2025

Israel competed at the 2019 World Athletics Championships in Doha, Qatar, from 27 September to 6 October 2019.

== Results ==
(q – qualified, NM – no mark, SB – season best)

=== Women ===
Track and road events

Athlete	Event	Heats		Semi-finals		Final	
Athlete	Event	Result	Rank	Result	Rank	Result	Rank
Diana Vaisman	100 metres	11.39	30	Did not advance			
Adva Cohen	3000 metres steeplechase	9:42.92	24	—N/a		Did not advance	
Lonah Chemtai Salpeter	Marathon	—N/a				DNF	–
