= Israel at the World Athletics Championships =

Israel's competition at the World Championships of Athletics

- IOC code: ISR
- Website: www.iaa.co.il
- Medals Ranked 80th: Gold 0 Silver 3 Bronze 2 Total 5

World Athletics Championships appearances (overview)
- 1976; 1980; 1983; 1987; 1991; 1993; 1995; 1997; 1999; 2001; 2003; 2005; 2007; 2009; 2011; 2013; 2015; 2017; 2019; 2022; 2023; 2025

This is a record of Israel at the World Athletics Championships. Israel has won five medals at the World Athletics Championships.

Israeli Aleksandr Averbukh, won the bronze in 1999, and the silver in 2001.

Israel's third medal came in 2015 when former Ukrainian Hanna Knyazyeva-Minenko improved on her national record with a 14.78 m jump. Knyazyeva-Minenko's medal was the first World Championship medal for an Israeli woman.

On 18 July 2022, Kenyan-born Israeli runner Lonah Chemtai Salpeter won the bronze medal in the women's marathon to give Israel its fourth medal.

On 27 August 2023, Ethiopian-born Israeli runner Maru Teferi won the silver medal in the men's marathon, marking Israel's fifth medal.

== Medal tables ==
=== Medals by year ===
| Games | Gold | Silver | Bronze | Total |
|---|---|---|---|---|
| 1999 | 0 | 0 | 1 | 1 |
| 2001 | 0 | 1 | 0 | 1 |
| 2015 | 0 | 1 | 0 | 1 |
| 2022 | 0 | 0 | 1 | 1 |
| 2023 | 0 | 1 | 0 | 1 |
| Totals (5 entries) | 0 | 3 | 2 | 5 |

=== Medals by sport ===
| Sport | Gold | Silver | Bronze | Total |
|---|---|---|---|---|
| Marathons | 0 | 1 | 1 | 2 |
| Pole vault | 0 | 1 | 1 | 2 |
| Triple jump | 0 | 1 | 0 | 1 |
| Totals (3 entries) | 0 | 3 | 2 | 5 |

=== List of medalists ===
| Medal | Name | Games | Event |
|---|---|---|---|
| Bronze | Aleksandr Averbukh | 1999 | Pole vault |
| Silver | Aleksandr Averbukh | 2001 | Pole vault |
| Silver | Hanna Knyazyeva-Minenko | 2015 | Triple jump |
| Bronze | Lonah Chemtai Salpeter | 2022 | Marathon |
| Silver | Maru Teferi | 2023 | Marathon |
