= Israel at the 2017 World Championships in Athletics =

Israel's competition at the 2017 World Championships of Athletics

- WA code: ISR
- Website: www.iaa.co.il

in London
- Competitors: 8 in 4 events
- Medals: Gold 0 Silver 0 Bronze 0 Total 0

World Championships in Athletics appearances (overview)
- 1976; 1980; 1983; 1987; 1991; 1993; 1995; 1997; 1999; 2001; 2003; 2005; 2007; 2009; 2011; 2013; 2015; 2017; 2019; 2022; 2023; 2025

Israel competed at the 2017 World Championships in Athletics in London, United Kingdom, from 4 to 13 August 2017.

== Results ==
(q – qualified, NM – no mark, SB – season best)

=== Men ===
Track and road events

| Athlete | Event | Final | |
| Athlete | Event | Result | Rank |
|---|---|---|---|
| Girmaw Amare | Marathon | 2:26:37 | 63 |
| Maru Teferi | Marathon | DNF | – |

=== Women ===
Track and road events

| Athlete | Event | Final | |
| Athlete | Event | Result | Rank |
|---|---|---|---|
| Yelena Dolinin | Marathon | DNS | – |
| Lonah Chemtai Salpeter | Marathon | 2:40:22 SB | 41 |
| Maor Tiyouri | Marathon | 2:49:45 SB | 63 |

Field events

| Athlete | Event | Qualification | | Final | |
| Athlete | Event | Distance | Position | Distance | Position |
|---|---|---|---|---|---|
| Hanna Knyazyeva-Minenko | Triple jump | 14.17 | 8 q | 14.42 SB | 4 |
| Marharyta Dorozhon | Javelin throw | 61.33 | 14 | Did not advance | |
