= Israel at the 2015 World Championships in Athletics =

Israel's competition at the 2015 World Championships of Athletics

- WA code: ISR
- Website: www.iaa.co.il

in Beijing
- Competitors: 5 in 4 events
- Medals Ranked 25th: Gold 0 Silver 1 Bronze 0 Total 1

World Championships in Athletics appearances (overview)
- 1976; 1980; 1983; 1987; 1991; 1993; 1995; 1997; 1999; 2001; 2003; 2005; 2007; 2009; 2011; 2013; 2015; 2017; 2019; 2022; 2023; 2025

Israel competed at the 2015 World Championships in Athletics in Beijing, China, from 22–30 August 2015.

Hanna Knyazyeva-Minenko made a big improvement to her own National Record of her new country Israel with a 14.78. Her lead lasted through two jumpers before Ibargüen took the lead with her second round 14.80. Knyazyeva-Minenko's medal was the first World Championship medal for an Israeli woman.

== Medalists ==
The following competitors from Israel won medals at the Championships

| Medal | Athlete | Event | Date |
|---|---|---|---|
| Silver | Hanna Knyazyeva-Minenko | Triple jump | 24 August |

== Results ==
(q – qualified, NM – no mark, SB – season best)

=== Men ===
Track and road events

| Athlete | Event | Heat | | Semifinal | | Final | |
| Athlete | Event | Result | Rank | Result | Rank | Result | Rank |
|---|---|---|---|---|---|---|---|
| Donald Sanford | 400 metres | DNS | | did not advance | | | |

Field events

| Athlete | Event | Qualification | | Final | |
| Athlete | Event | Distance | Position | Distance | Position |
|---|---|---|---|---|---|
| Dmitry Kroytor | High jump | 2.22 | 33 | did not advance | |

=== Women ===
Track and road events

| Athlete | Event | Heat | | Semifinal | | Final | |
| Athlete | Event | Result | Rank | Result | Rank | Result | Rank |
|---|---|---|---|---|---|---|---|
| Olga Lenskiy | 200 metres | 23.63 | 46 | did not advance | | | |

Field events

| Athlete | Event | Qualification | | Final | |
| Athlete | Event | Distance | Position | Distance | Position |
|---|---|---|---|---|---|
| Hanna Knyazyeva-Minenko | Triple jump | 14.27 | 5 Q | 14.78 NR | 2nd place, silver medalist(s) |
| Marharyta Dorozhon | Javelin throw | 61.04 | 16 | did not advance | |
