= Athletics at the 1999 Summer Universiade – Men's half marathon =

The men's half marathon event at the 1999 Summer Universiade was held on 11 July in Palma de Mallorca, Spain.

== Results ==
| Rank | Athlete | Nationality | Time | Notes |
|---|---|---|---|---|
| 1st place, gold medalist(s) | Marílson Gomes dos Santos | Brazil | 1:04:05 | |
| 2nd place, silver medalist(s) | Takayuki Nishida | Japan | 1:04:11 | |
| 3rd place, bronze medalist(s) | Oh Sung-keun | South Korea | 1:04:33 | PB |
| 4 | Mark Steinle | Great Britain | 1:04:45 | |
| 5 | Takashi Maeda | Japan | 1:04:50 | |
| 6 | Solomon Wachira | Kenya | 1:05:10 | |
| 7 | Iván Sánchez | Spain | 1:05:14 | |
| 8 | Janko Benša | Yugoslavia | 1:05:52 | |
| 9 | Giacomo Leone | Italy | 1:06:10 | |
| 10 | Wodage Zvadya | Israel | 1:06:17 | |
| 11 | Abdellah Bay | Morocco | 1:06:44 | |
| 12 | Kensuke Takahashi | Japan | 1:06:49 | |
| 13 | George Probst | United States | 1:07:27 | |
| 14 | Vicente Capitán | Spain | 1:07:36 | |
| 15 | Geoffrey Fleming | United States | 1:07:42 | |
| 16 | Isidoro Martínez | Mexico | 1:07:51 | |
| 17 | Christian Friis | Denmark | 1:10:00 | |
| 18 | Christian Madsen | Denmark | 1:10:52 | |
| 19 | Roberto Meléndez | Spain | 1:11:13 | |
| 20 | Thembelani Zola | South Africa | 1:12:10 | |
| 21 | Peter Öhman | Sweden | 1:12:28 | |
| 22 | Daniel Leburu | South Africa | 1:13:10 | |
| 23 | Prithbi Thapa Bahadur | Nepal | 1:16:00 | |
| 24 | Jaganath Bista | Nepal | 1:17:04 | |
| | Ibrahim Abba Gombo | Chad | DNF | |
| | Cian McLoughlin | Ireland | DNF | |
| | Mohamed Afaadas | Morocco | DNF | |
| | Kevin Zammit | Malta | DNF | |
| | Francis Mwihia | Kenya | DNS | |
| | Fecri Idim | Turkey | DNS | |
