= Tesama Moogas =

Israeli long-distance runner

Tesama Moogas טסמה מוגס
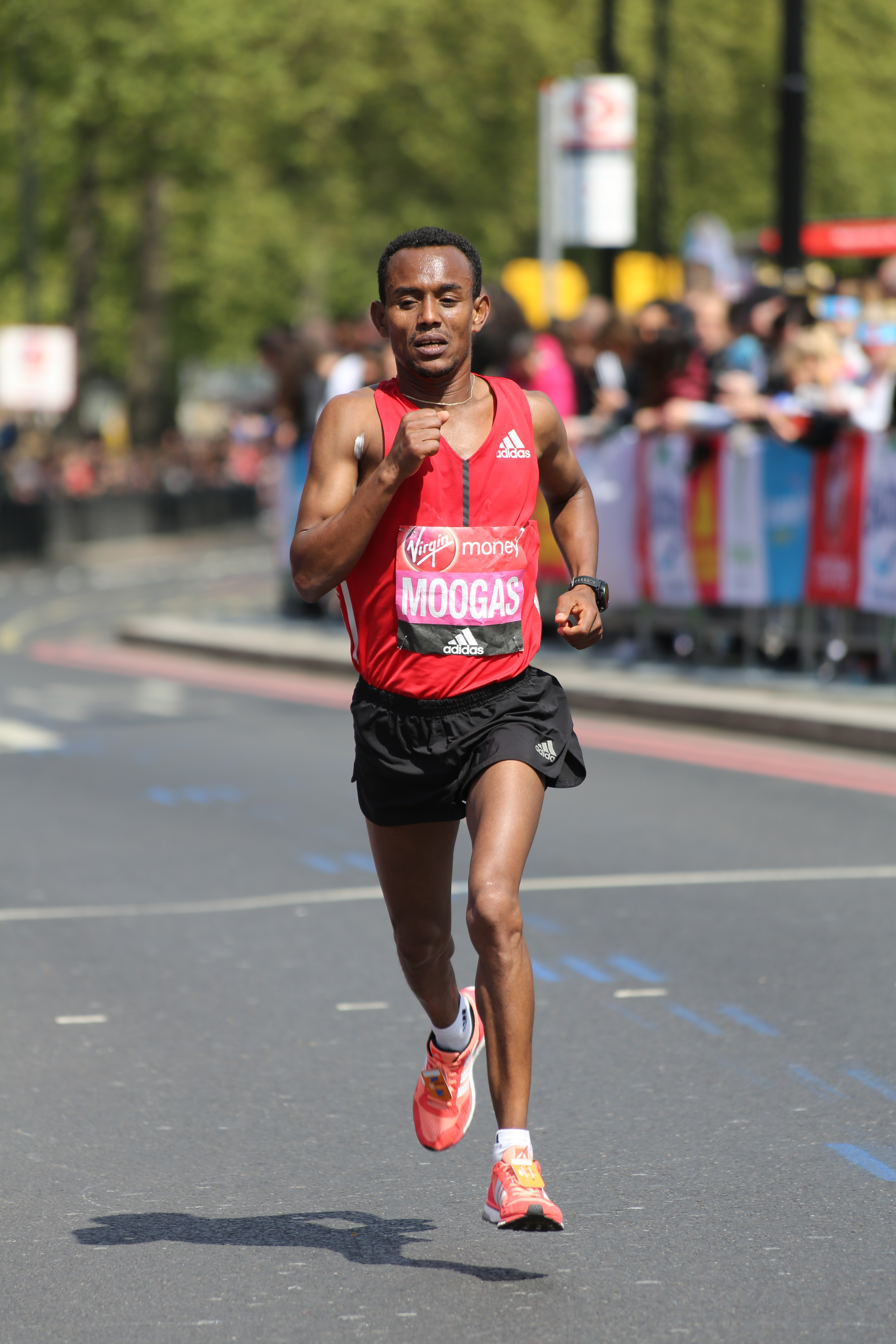
- Moogas at the 2017 London Marathon

Personal information
- Nationality: Israeli
- Born: 2 February 1988 (age 38) Ethiopia
- Height: 1.65 m (5 ft 5 in)
- Weight: 52 kg (115 lb)

Sport
- Country: Israel
- Sport: Running
- Event(s): 10,000 Metres, Half Marathon, Marathon
- Coached by: Amnon Gur and Zohar Zimro

Achievements and titles
- Personal bests: Half Marathon: 1:04:40; Marathon: 2:13:40; 10,000m: 28:12.58

Tesama Moogas (Hebrew: טסמה מוגס, born 2 February 1988) is an Ethiopian-born Israeli long-distance runner.

== Early life ==
Moogas was born in Ethiopia, and grew up in the village of Jojam. He immigrated to Israel when he was 20 years old, in 2008. He lives at the Wingate Institute, in Netanya, Israel.

== Running career ==
=== Early career ===
Early in his career Moogas focused on running in 5,000 m and 10,000 m events.

Moogas competed in 10,000 metres at the 2010 European Athletics Championships, placing 20th with a time of 29:50.78 minutes, and at the 2012 European Athletics Championships, placing 18th with a time of 29:22.03 minutes.

=== 2015-present ===
In 2015, he finished the Berlin Marathon, his second competitive marathon, with a time of 2:15:29 and placed 25th. It was the third-best all-time result for an Israeli marathoner, not far behind the Israeli national record of 2:14:21 set by Olympian Ayele Seteng. On the basis of his time, Moogas qualified to represent Israel at the 2016 Summer Olympics.

In March 2016, Moogas placed 55th at the 2016 IAAF World Half Marathon Championships, in a time of 1:06.41.

He competed for Israel at the 2016 Summer Olympics in the marathon, and finished 121st with a time of 2:30:30. At the Florence Marathon in Italy in November 2019, he set his personal best with a time of 2:13:40.
