= Israel at the 1983 World Championships in Athletics =

- Flag of Israel
- WA code: ISR

in Helsinki, Finland August 7–14, 1983
- Competitors: 3 (2 men and 1 woman) in 3 events

World Championships in Athletics appearances (overview)
- 1976; 1980; 1983; 1987; 1991; 1993; 1995; 1997; 1999; 2001; 2003; 2005; 2007; 2009; 2011; 2013; 2015; 2017; 2019; 2022; 2023

Israel competed at the 1983 World Championships in Athletics in Helsinki, Finland, from August 7 to 14, 1983.

== Men ==
Track and road events

Athlete	Event	Heat		Semifinal		Final	
Athlete	Event	Result	Rank	Result	Rank	Result	Rank
Mark Handelsman	800 metres	1:49.02	34	Did not advance			
Yair Karni	Marathon	—				Did not finish	

== Women ==
Track and road events

Athlete	Event	Heat		Semifinal		Final	
Athlete	Event	Result	Rank	Result	Rank	Result	Rank
Zehava Shmueli	Marathon	—				2:49:07	36
