= Israel at the 2023 World Athletics Championships =

- Flag of Israel
- WA code: ISR

in Budapest, Hungary 19 August 2023 – 27 August 2023
- Competitors: 6 (4 men and 2 women)
- Medals Ranked 27th: Gold 0 Silver 1 Bronze 0 Total 1

World Athletics Championships appearances (overview)
- 1976; 1980; 1983; 1987; 1991; 1993; 1995; 1997; 1999; 2001; 2003; 2005; 2007; 2009; 2011; 2013; 2015; 2017; 2019; 2022; 2023

Israel competed at the 2023 World Athletics Championships in Budapest, Hungary, from 19 to 27 August 2023.

== Medallists ==
Medal	Name	Event	Date
Silver	Maru Teferi	Men's marathon	27 August

== Results ==
Israel entered 4 athletes.

Key

- Q = Qualified for the next round
- q = Qualified for the next round as a fastest loser or, in field events, by position without achieving the qualifying target
- NR = National record
- PB = Personal best
- SB = Season best
- N/A = Round not applicable for the event

=== Men ===
Track and road events

Athlete	Event	Heat		Semifinal		Final	
Athlete	Event	Result	Rank	Result	Rank	Result	Rank
Blessing Afrifah	200 metres	20.73	5	Did not advance			
Haimro Alame	Marathon	—				2:12:32	20
Maru Teferi	Marathon	—				2:09:12 SB	2nd place, silver medalist(s)

=== Women ===
Track and road events

Athlete	Event	Final	
Athlete	Event	Result	Rank
Lonah Chemtai Salpeter	Marathon	2:25:38	4
