= Israeli Athletic Association =

Israeli governing body of athletics

Israeli Athletics Association
- איגוד האתלטיקה הישראל
- Sport: Athletics
- Abbreviation: IAA
- Founded: 1931
- Affiliation: World Athletics
- Regional affiliation: European Athletic Association
- Affiliation date: 1989
- Headquarters: 10 Shitrit Street, Tel Aviv
- President: Doron Kofman

Official website
- www.iaa.co.il
- (Israel)

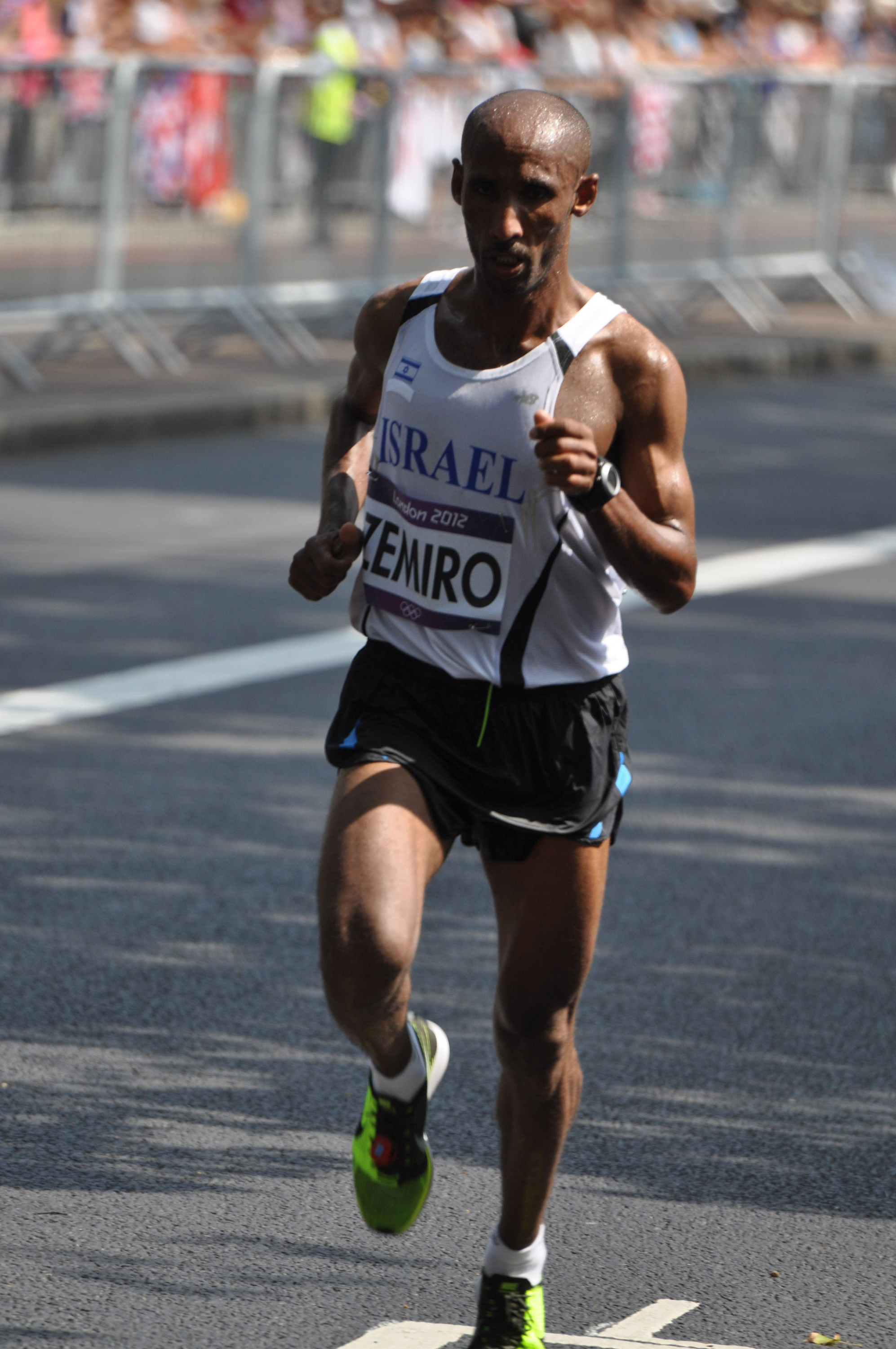
Zohar Zemiro

The Israeli Athletic Association (IAA; Hebrew: איגוד האתלטיקה הישראל) is the governing body of athletics in Israel. Doron Kofman is its President, and Jack Cohen is its General Secretary.

== History ==
It was founded in 1931, as the Federation for Amateur Sports in Palestine. The State of Israel was formed in 1948, and Israel first participated in the Olympics in 1952. In September 1989, Primo Nebiolo announced that the International Amateur Athletics Federation (IAAF) congress voted unanimously to make Israel a "temporary" member of the European Athletic Association.

Israel's first track and field global medal was won by Aleksandr Averbukh, who won a silver medal in the pole vault at the 2001 World Championships in Athletics. The IAA named Ethiopian-born distance runner Zohar Zimro its 2011 Athlete of the Year.

== Kit suppliers ==
Israel's kit are currently supplied by Nike.

== See also ==
- Sport in Israel

== External lists ==
- Official website
