= Athletics at the 2001 Summer Universiade – Men's half marathon =

The men's half marathon event at the 2001 Summer Universiade was held in Beijing, China on 1 September.

== Results ==
| Rank | Athlete | Nationality | Time | Notes |
|---|---|---|---|---|
| 1st place, gold medalist(s) | Masakazu Fujiwara | Japan | 1:04:12 | |
| 2nd place, silver medalist(s) | Wodage Zvadya | Israel | 1:04:30 | |
| 3rd place, bronze medalist(s) | Ryoji Matsushita | Japan | 1:04:53 | |
| 4 | Brian Sell | United States | 1:05:16 | |
| 5 | Abdellah Bay | Morocco | 1:05:29 | |
| 6 | Song Yong Ho | North Korea | 1:05:31 | |
| 7 | Carlos Jaramillo | Chile | 1:06:06 | |
| 8 | Jonathan Monje | Chile | 1:06:35 | |
| 9 | Brahim Chettah | Algeria | 1:07:09 | |
| 10 | Miklós Zatykó | Hungary | 1:07:18 | |
| 11 | Wu Wen-Chien | Chinese Taipei | 1:07:24 | |
| 12 | Ben Chesang | Uganda | 1:07:36 | |
| 13 | Yu Won Nam | North Korea | 1:08:17 | |
| 14 | Donatien Buzingo | Burundi | 1:08:20 | |
| 15 | Ahmed Naili | Algeria | 1:08:46 | |
| 16 | Jonnatan Morales | Mexico | 1:09:18 | |
| 17 | David Bazzi | United States | 1:09:19 | |
| 18 | Nicholas Mugomeri | Zimbabwe | 1:09:27 | |
| 19 | Pak Pong Nam | North Korea | 1:09:53 | |
| 20 | Kil Jae Son | North Korea | 1:10:38 | |
| 21 | Iaroslav Muşinschi | Moldova | 1:11:26 | |
| 22 | Lee Myong-Seung | South Korea | 1:11:27 | |
| 23 | Jaganath Bista | Nepal | 1:13:11 | |
| 24 | Yu Young-jin | South Korea | 1:13:40 | |
| 25 | Majed Al-Bousafi | Oman | 1:23:13 | |
| 26 | Khaled Al-Minji | Oman | 1:23:16 | |
