= Enrique Vera Ibáñez =

Mexican-Swedish race walking athlete

Medal record

Men's athletics

Representing Mexico

World Championships in Athletics
Silver medal – second place	1976 Malmö	50 km walk

IAAF World Race Walking Cup
Silver medal – second place	1979 Eschborn	50 km walk

Enrique Vera Ibáñez (born 31 May 1954) is a Mexican and Swedish former race walking athlete.

His first major medal came at the 1975 Central American and Caribbean Championships in Athletics, where he beat his compatriot Domingo Colín to win the 20 kilometres walk title. The 50 kilometres race walk was dropped from the 1976 Summer Olympics programme and the International Amateur Athletics Federation held its own 1976 World Championships in Athletics in Malmö that year to make up for the omission. Vera came away with the silver medal in a time of 3:58:14 hours – the biggest accolade of his career.

He failed to defend his regional 20 km title at the 1977 Central American and Caribbean Championships in Athletics, as he was runner-up some distance behind the reigning Olympic champion Daniel Bautista. He was part of a strong Mexican contingent in the men's 50 km at the 1977 IAAF World Race Walking Cup, but he was disqualified at the competition. His next appearance on the world stage in the 50 km walk brought another medal: he was again behind another Mexican walker, this time Martín Bermúdez, but he took the 1979 IAAF World Race Walking Cup silver medal.

After the 1970s he had less success internationally. He was disqualified at the 1981 and 1983 IAAF World Race Walking Cup. With the launch of the first ever full programme World Championships in Athletics in 1983, Vera entered the 20 km walk and finished in sixteenth place.

He married fellow race walker Siv Vera-Ibañez and settled in her native Sweden. Enrique gained Swedish citizenship and had a brief comeback to represent his new country at the 1991 World Championships in Athletics (he was disqualified in the 50 km walk). The couple had two children, Ato Ibáñez (1985) and Perseus Karlström (1990) both representing Sweden in race walking. The couple were later divorced.
