= Maor Tiyouri =

Israeli long-distance runner

Maor Tiyouri מאור טיורי
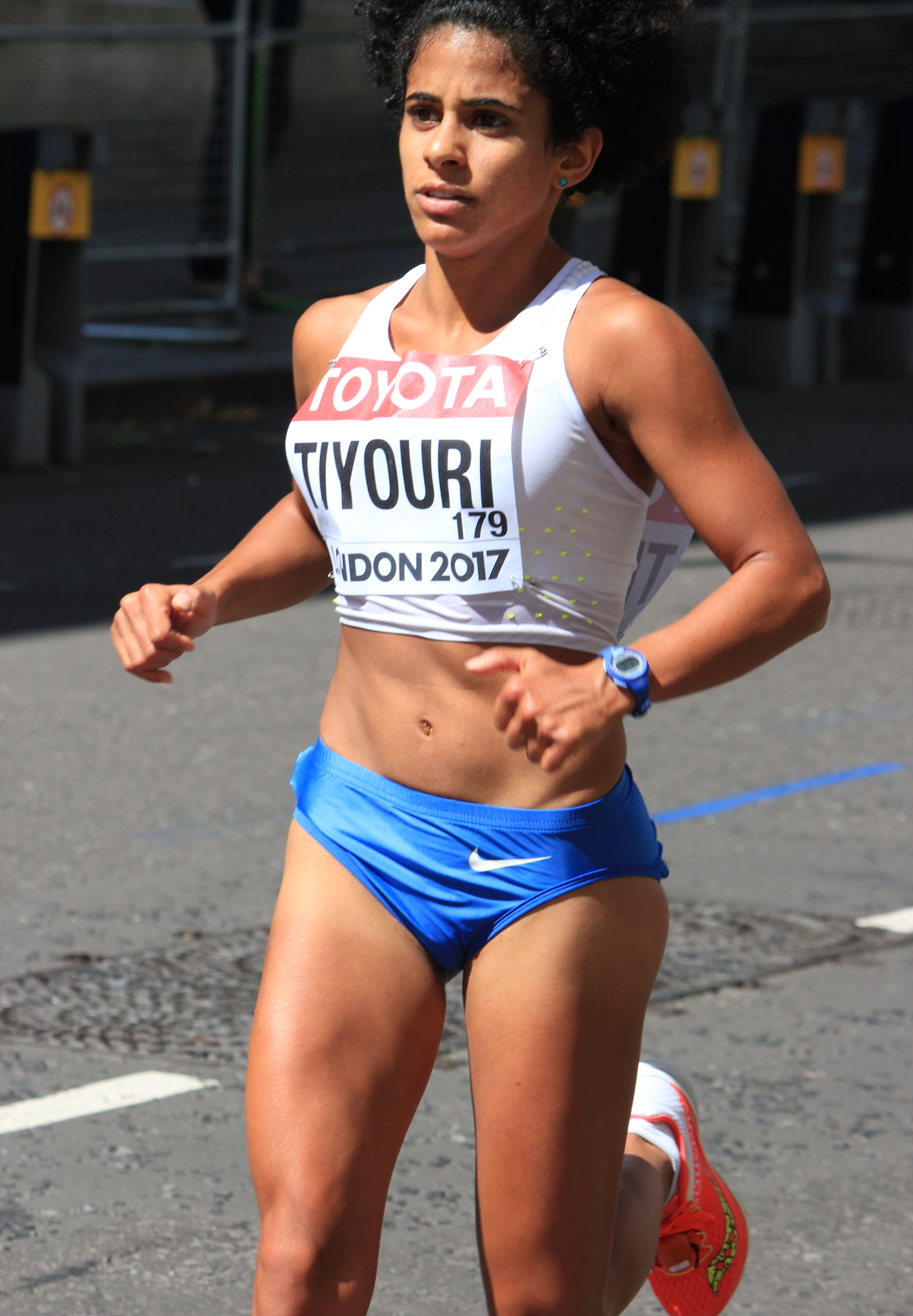
- Tiyouri at the 2017 IAAF World Championships

Personal information
- Nationality: Israeli
- Born: 13 August 1990 (age 36), Kfar Saba, Israel
- Height: 1.48 m (4 ft 10 in)
- Weight: 44 kg (97 lb)

Sport
- Country: Israel
- Sport: Athletics
- Events: 1500 metres, 5000 metres, 10K run, half marathon, marathon
- College team: San Francisco Dons
- Club: Boulder Harriers, Leader Jerusalem
- Turned pro: 2014
- Coached by: Steve Jones (formerly); Dan Salpeter

Achievements and titles
- Personal bests: Marathon: 2:26:39; Half marathon: 1:10:30; 10,000 m: 32:29.33; 5000 m: 15:54.47; 1500 m: 4:26.86
Medal record
Women's athletics
Representing Israel
European Games
Bronze medal – third place	2015 Baku	Mixed team
European Running Championships
Silver medal – second place	2025 Brussels‑Leuven	Marathon team
Maccabiah Games
Silver medal – second place	2009 Israel	1500 m
Silver medal – second place	2013 Israel	3000 m
Bronze medal – third place	2009 Israel	800 m

Maor Tiyouri (Hebrew: מאור טיורי; born 13 August 1990) is an Israeli Olympic long-distance runner, former national record holder of Israel in the 5000 metres, and a six-time Israeli national champion – in the 1500 m (three times), the 3000 m, the 5,000 m, and the 10,000 m. She competed for Israel in the marathon in both the 2016 Olympic Games and the 2020 Olympic Games. Tiyouri represented Israel at the 2024 Paris Olympics in the Women's marathon, coming in 49th.

== Early life ==
Tiyouri is a native of Kfar Saba, Israel, and is Jewish. Her parents are Gideon (formerly a long-distance runner) and Irit Tiyouri (an administrative assistant at Tel Aviv University), and she has two younger brothers. She attended Yitzhak Sadeh School, and Galili High School. She is the granddaughter of Iraqi Jews and Iranian Jews. As of 2023, she was based in Boulder, Colorado. She is 1.48 m (4 ft 10 in) tall, and weighs 44 kg (97 lb). Ruminating about her strengths and weaknesses, she said: "I think it’s my superpower, but also my Achilles heel, that I feel a lot of things."

== College ==
After finishing her two years of military service at 20 years of age, Tiyouri studied on scholarship for four years at the University of San Francisco, majoring in Exercise and Sport Science. She competed with the San Francisco Dons as a member of four consecutive West Coast Conference (WCC) cross country champion teams, made two trips to the NCAA Cross Country Championships with the team, and made two 10,000-meter semifinal appearances. She graduated in 2014.

In 2011 Tiyouri was the top runner at the WCC Individual Championship with a time of 35:16.57 in the 10,000 m. In 2012 she won the West Coast Invitational 10,000 m, was second in the Aggie Open 1500 m with a time of 4:35.65, and was second in the Cal Opener 3000 m with a time of 4:35.65. In 2013, she came in third in the 1500 m with a time of 4:31.91 at the Brutus Hamilton Invitational, second in the 5000 m at the West Coast Invitational 11 May with a time of 16:30.35, as well as third in the Stanford Invitational 5000 m with a time of 16:42.09 and third in the UC Davis Aggie Open 1500 m with a time of 4:40.22. In 2014 she came in second in the 3000 m at the Cal Opener with a time of 9:40.32. She was First Team All-West Coast Conference in 2010, 2011, and 2013, and All-West Coast Conference Honorable Mention in 2012. In 2013, she received the Breakthrough Performance Award at the University of San Francisco.

She became the second Olympian, following Haley Nemra who represented the Marshall Islands in the 2008 and 2012 Olympic Games in the women's 800 meters, to come out of the university's track & field team coached by Helen Lehman-Winters. Tiyouri was one of three University of San Francisco alumni to compete in the 2016 Olympics, joined by basketball player John Cox and synchronized swimmer Mariya Koroleva.

== Maccabiah Games ==
Tiyouri was the silver medalist in the 1500 m and a bronze medalist in the 800 m at the 2009 Maccabiah Games. She was then a silver medalist in the 3000 m at the 2013 Maccabiah Games.

== Israeli championships and records ==
Tiyouri is a six-time Israeli national champion. She won the Israeli championship in 2005 in the 3000 m, in 2010 in the 10,000 m, in 2011 in the 1500 m, in 2013 in the 1500 m and 5000 m, and in 2015 in the 1500 m. Tiyouri is also the Israeli record holder in the 5000 m, with a time of 16:08.83 set at the 2015 Mt. SAC Relays.

== 2015-16; European Games and Ottawa Marathon ==
At the 2015 European Games, Tiyouri was second in the 1500 (personal best of 4:26.86) and 3000 (personal best of 9:32.11), helping Israel win the bronze medal.

In June 2015 she said: "My favorite run today is 5,000 meters, but even I've never run a marathon or a half marathon. There are many people who want me to run a marathon next year to try to get to Rio. I don't know yet what my coach's plans are. He might surprise me and tell me we're going to run a marathon."

On 29 May 2016, she finished the Ottawa Marathon in Canada, her first-ever marathon, with a time of 2:42:20 hours, and placed 7th. On the basis of her time, Tiyouri qualified to represent Israel at the 2016 Summer Olympics.

== 2017; World Championships ==
Tiyouri qualified to represent Israel at the 2017 World Championships in Athletics in the 2017 World Championships in Athletics – Women's marathon in London where she placed 63rd in a time of 2:49:45.

== 2018-20; Injuries and half marathon personal best ==
In 2018–20, she suffered a series of injuries that kept her from running for almost two years. Among them were pain in her foot and ankle due to an injury, a stress fracture in the metatarsal bone in her right foot, a herniated disc in her back, and a hamstring injury.

In October 2020 in Gdynia, Poland, Tiyouri ran a personal best half marathon time of 1:12:27.

== 2021-23; Second Olympic qualification ==
In April 2021 at the Cheshire Marathon near Manchester, England, Tiyouri had a time of 2:29:03. With that, she qualified for the Tokyo Olympics. It was her first marathon in almost four years, after delays due to injuries and the COVID-19 pandemic.

In June 2022, she won the bronze medal in the inaugural Bank of America Chicago 13.1, in a time of 1:13:45.

In October 2023, nine days after the 2023 Hamas-led attack on Israel, she ran in the Great 10K Berlin in Germany, and came in fifth with a time of 34:11 minutes. She said: "The whole last week since the terrible Saturday has been really difficult emotionally, mentally, and physically in light of the horrors we experienced. It directly puts sports in perspective. Somewhere the thought of sports feels absurd when our country is at war, and when we are trying to digest the dimensions of hell. I was really confused Whether to compete or not, but after several conversations with family, very close friends. and the athletics association, I decided that I should compete because this is my way to represent the Israeli people, to be an ambassador and to contribute to the overall effort. To show everyone that we are strong and not going anywhere."

In 2023 she took on Dan Salpeter as her coach.

== 2024; Marathon personal best ==
In January 2024 Tiyouri ran in the Aramco Houston Half Marathon, in Texas, and came in 24th with a time of 1:12:42.

In April 2024 Tiyouri ran in the NN Marathon Rotterdam, in the Netherlands, and finished in 8th place with a personal best time of 2:26:39.

== Olympics; 2016, 2020, and 2024 ==
Tiyouri represented Israel at the 2016 Olympics in the women's marathon in Rio de Janeiro. She finished with a time of 2:47:27 hours, 90th out of 133 competitors, as the race was won by Jemima Jelagat Sumgong of Kenya in a time of 2:24:04 hours. Tiyouri placed 48th out of 91 women in Sapporo at Athletics at the 2020 Summer Olympics – Women's marathon and she finished with a time of 2:37:52. She said: "I felt that we, as a team, got to commemorate the Israeli Olympic delegation of the 1972 Munich Olympic Games, where 11 Israeli athletes lost their lives in a terrorist attack, and showing everybody that even 44 years later, we are still here."

Tiyouri represented Israel at the 2020 Summer Olympics in 2021 in Tokyo, Japan in the hot (the temperature hit the high 80s) and intensely humid women's marathon. She came in 48th out of 88 runners, beating 30 women who were ranked ahead of her going into the race, with a time of 2:37:52, as the gold medal was won by Kenya's Peres Jepchirchir with a time of 2:27.20.

Tiyouri represented Israel at the 2024 Paris Olympics in the Women's marathon, finishing 49th with a time of 2:33:37. She said: "In these difficult days, I am very proud to continue representing the State of Israel."

== See also ==
- List of Israeli records in athletics
