= Kfir Golan =

Israeli sprinter

Personal information
- Nationality: Israel
- Born: כפיר גולן; June 10, 1974 (age 52)

Sport
- Sport: Athletics
- Event: Sprints

Achievements and titles
- Personal best: 100 metres: 10.46 seconds (1997)

Kfir Golan (Hebrew: כפיר גולן; born 10 June 1974) is a retired Israeli sprinter.

He competed at the 1994 European Championships and the 1995 World Championships without reaching the final. He won five national championships. In the 4 x 100 metres relay he competed at the 2000 Olympic Games and the 2001 World Championships without reaching the final.

His personal best time was 10.46 seconds, achieved in 1997.
