= Aleksandr Fingert =

Israeli javelin thrower

Aleksandr Fingert (Hebrew: אלכסנדר פינגרט; born 1 May 1965) is a retired Israeli javelin thrower.

His personal best time was 80.18 meters, achieved in September 1989 in Baku, while representing the Soviet Union. He later competed for Israel, and participated at the 1995 and 1997 World Championships. He won the Israeli championship in 1992, 1994, 1995, 1996 and 1997, forming a rivalry with fellow ex-Soviet thrower Vadim Bavikin.

== International competitions ==
Year	Competition	Venue	Position	Notes
Representing Israel
1995	World Championships	Gothenburg, Sweden	31st	70.94 m
1997	World Championships	Athens, Greece	33rd	69.74 m
