= Zohar Zimro =

Israeli long-distance runner

Zohar Zimro זוהר זימרו
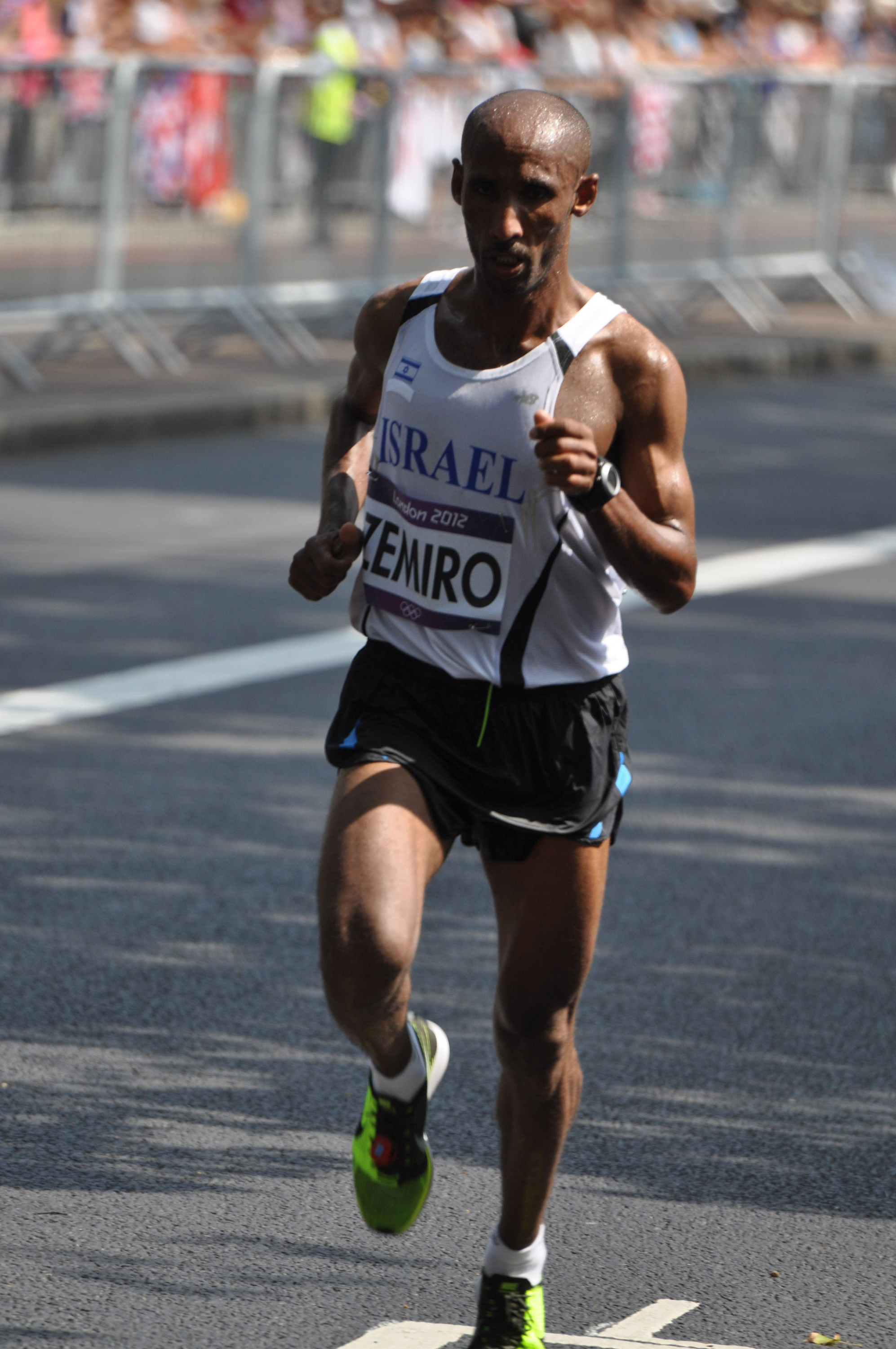
- Zohar Zimro at the 2012 Olympics

Personal information
- Nationality: Israeli
- Born: July 25, 1977 (age 49) Ethiopia
- Height: 1.71 m (5 ft 7 1/2 in)
- Weight: 57 kg (126 lb)

Sport
- Country: Israel
- Sport: Running
- Event: Marathon

Achievements and titles
- Personal bests: Half Marathon: 1:06:04; Marathon: 2:14:28; 10,000m: 29:53.33

Zohar Zimro (or Zemiro; Hebrew: זוהר זימרו; born June 15, 1977) is an Israeli marathon runner.

He was born in Woozaba, Ethiopia, and is one of about 120,000 Israeli-Ethiopians, a community that includes fellow Israeli Ethiopian marathoners Setegne Ayele and former Olympian Asaf Bimro. His personal best time is 2:14:28. He represented Israel at the 2012 Summer Olympics.

== Early life ==
He was born in Ethiopia in 1977, and immigrated to Israel at the age of 10.

== Running career ==
At the age of 16 he was discovered by his high-school sport teacher.

=== 2009 ===
His debut was a 23rd place at the Berlin Marathon in 2:23:48.

=== 2010 ===
After a 22nd place at the Paris Marathon he came in 38th at the 2010 European Athletics Championships in Barcelona with a time of 2:36:58.

=== 2011 ===
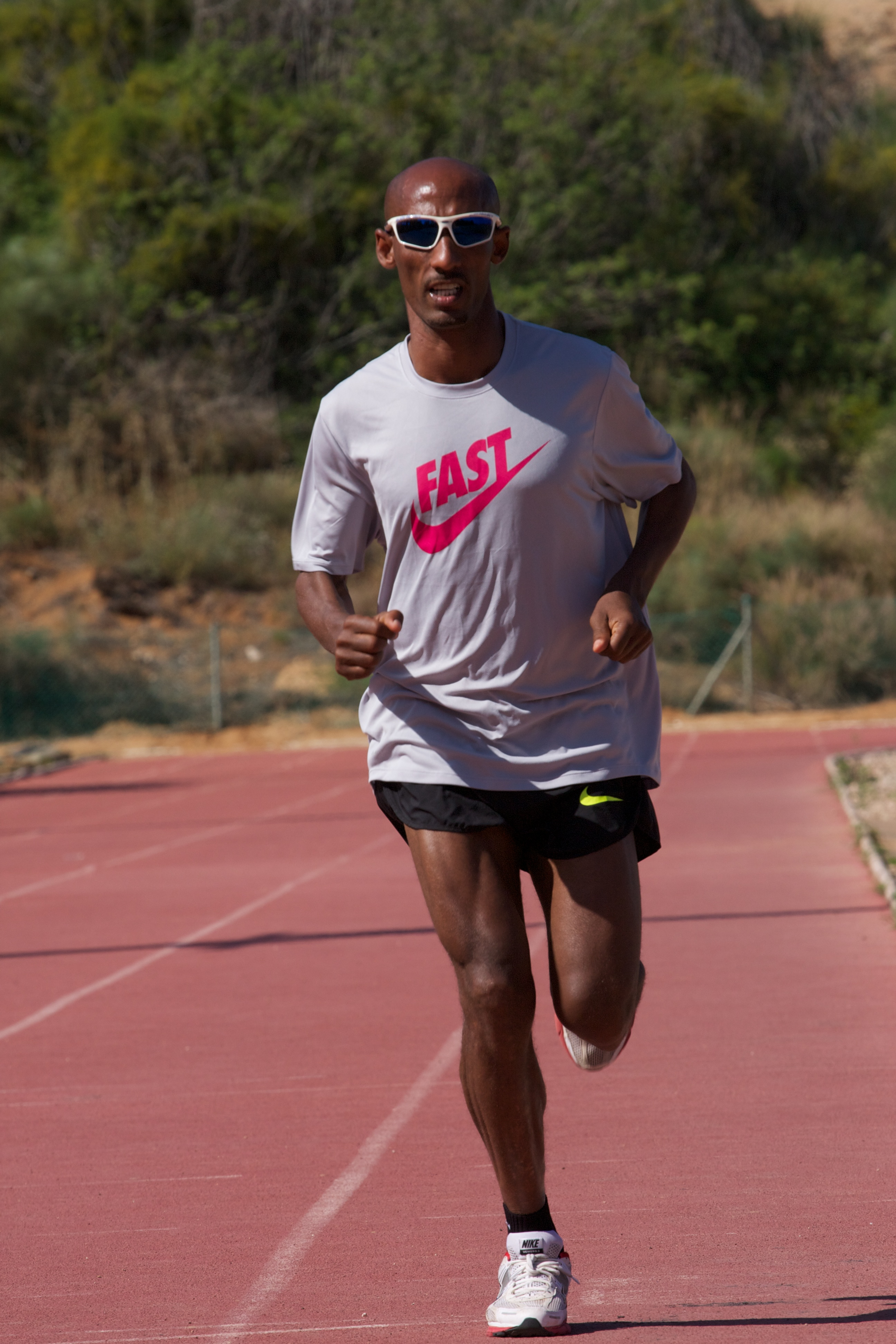
Zimro training (2011)

On January 6, 2011, he ran the 34th Tiberius Marathon in Israel in a time of 2:21:33, coming in second of all Israelis and 18th of all runners. In February 2011, he ran a half marathon in Ein Gedi, Israel, in a personal best time of 1:06:19.

In April 2011, he ran the Amsterdam Marathon in a personal record time of 2:14:28, coming in 10th. In doing so, he qualified to represent Israel at the 2012 Summer Olympics. Asked for his reaction, he said: "it is the happiest moment in my life." His time was 7 seconds short of Israel's national record time in the marathon, which was set by Ayale Setegne.

Zimro was named Athlete of the Year in 2011 by the Israel Athletics Association.

=== 2012 ===
In January 2012, he won the Israeli championships, while finishing 15th in the Tiberias Marathon in 2:15:06.

He was the only Israeli distance runner in the 2012 Summer Olympics. He described himself as "an ardent Zionist who is extremely proud and honoured to represent Israel", and said "To make aliyah as a child from Ethiopia and to end up representing Israel in the Olympics is the closing of a circle – a Cinderella story." He finished 80th in the marathon at the 2012 Summer Olympics,

== Philanthropy ==
In 2008, he established a non-profit organization with elite long-distance runners, called Running From The Heart. The founders are helping children and youth from diverse backgrounds to deal with problems and accomplish their goals in life through running.

Every week in all weather conditions, the children are educating by running, and learn how to break their limits in order to succeed.

== Achievements ==
Year	Competition	Venue	Position	Event	Notes
Representing Israel
2011	World Championships	Daegu, South Korea	—	Marathon	DNF
2012	Olympics	London, United Kingdom	81st	Marathon	2:34:59
2013	World Championships	Moscow, Russia	39th	Marathon	2:25:23
2014	World Championships	Copenhagen, Denmark	83rd	Half Marathon	1:06:04
