= Svetlana Gnezdilov =

Retired Ukrainian-born Israeli athlete

Personal information
- Native name: סבטלנה גנזדילוב
- Nationality: Israeli
- Born: 20 July 1969 (age 56) Ukraine, Soviet Union

Sport
- Sport: Athletics
- Event(s): Heptathlon, 100 metres hurdles, 60 metres hurdles, long jump

Svetlana Gnezdilov (Hebrew: סבטלנה גנזדילוב; born 20 July 1969) is a retired Ukrainian-born Israeli athlete who specialized in the 100 metres hurdles and the heptathlon.

She was a Ukrainian citizen until 1996 when she emigrated to Israel. In the short hurdles distances (100 and 60 metres) she competed at the 1999 World Championships, the 2001 World Indoor Championships, the 2001 World Championships and the 2002 European Championships without reaching the final.

She then switched to the heptathlon, where she finished fifteenth at the 2002 European Championships and 26th at the 2006 European Championships. She did not finish the competition at the 2003 World Championships. At the 2003 World Championships she also competed in the 4 x 400 metres relay. At the 2006 European Championships she also competed in the long jump.

Her personal best times were 8.28 seconds in the 60 metres hurdles, achieved at the 2001 World Indoor Championships in Lisbon; and 13.04 seconds in the 100 metres hurdles, achieved in June 2001 in Minsk. She has 6031 points in the heptathlon, achieved in August 2003 in Tel Aviv; and 6.46 metres in the long jump, achieved in July 2004 in Tel Aviv.

== See also ==
- List of Israeli records in athletics
