= Tommy Kafri =

Hungarian-Israeli sprinter

Personal information
- Native name: טומי כפרי
- Nationality: Israel
- Born: Mezei Tamás; October 3, 1976 (age 50) Budapest, Hungary

Sport
- Sport: Athletics
- Event: Sprints

Achievements and titles
- Personal bests: 100 metres: 10.23 seconds (1999); 200 metres: 20.89 seconds (1999)

Tommy Kafri (Hebrew: טומי כפרי; birth name Mezei Tamás; born 3 October 1976, Budapest) is a retired Hungarian-Israeli sprinter who specialized in the 100 and 200 metres.

He competed at the 1997 World Championships (100 metres), the 1998 European Indoor Championships (both 60 and 200 metres), the 1998 European Championships (in both 100 and 200 metres), the 1999 World Championships (both 100 and 200 metres) and the 2000 Olympic Games (100 metres). He won a single Israeli national title: in the 200 metres in 1996.

In the 4 x 100 metres relay he competed at the 1999 World Championships, the 2000 Olympic Games and the 2001 World Championships without reaching the final.

His personal best times were 10.23 seconds in the 100 metres, achieved in July 1999 in Tel Aviv; and 20.89 seconds in the 200 metres, achieved at the 1999 World Championships in Seville. He still holds the Israeli record in the 200 metres, tied with Gideon Jablonka.

He went back to Hungary in 2006, changed his nationality back to Hungarian in 2007.

== See also ==
- List of Israeli records in athletics
