= Wodage Zvadya =

Israeli long-distance runner

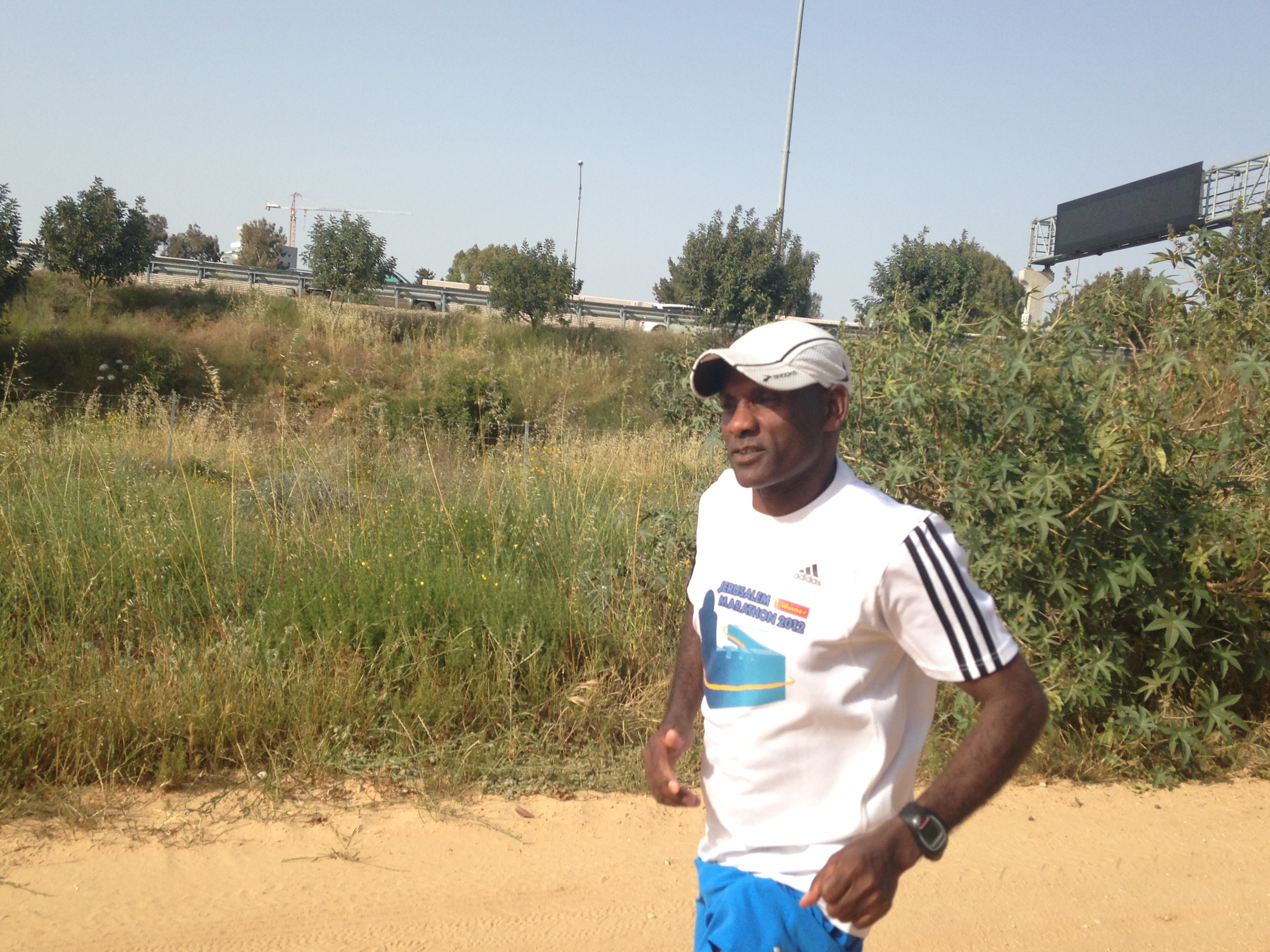

Personal information
- Nationality: Israeli
- Born: 7 September 1973 (age 53) Ethiopia (until 1991); later Israel

Sport
- Sport: Long-distance running
- Events: Marathon, Half marathon, 5000 m, 10,000 m

Achievements and titles
- Personal bests: 5000 m – 14:07.14 (July 1996); 10,000 m – 29:38.88 (May 1996); Half marathon – 1:04:30 (2001 Summer Universiade); Marathon – 2:16:04 (January 2004, Tiberias)
Medal record
Representing Israel
Summer Universiade
Silver medal – second place	2001 Beijing	Half marathon

Wodage Zvadya (Hebrew: וודג' זבדיה; born 7 September 1973) is an Israeli long-distance runner who specializes in the marathon.

== Biography ==
Wodage Zvadya was born in Ethiopia. He immigrated to Israel in 1991. He won the silver medal at the 2001 Summer Universiade. His best finish at the European or World Championships was a 22nd place at the 2002 European Championships. He also competed at the 2006 European Championships, the 2005, 2007 and 2009 World Championships and the 2001, 2002 and 2005 World Half Marathon Championships.

His personal best times are 14:07.14 minutes in the 5000 metres, achieved in July 1996 in Hechtel; 29:38.88 minutes in the 10,000 metres, achieved in May 1996 in Tel Aviv; 1:04:30 hours in the half marathon, achieved at the 2001 Summer Universiade in Beijing; and 2:16:04 seconds in the marathon, achieved in January 2004 in Tiberias.

== Achievements ==
Year	Competition	Venue	Position	Event	Notes
Representing Israel
1999	Universiade	Palma de Mallorca, Spain	10th	Half marathon	1:06:17
2001	Universiade	Beijing, PR China	2nd	Half marathon	1:04:30
2006	European Championships	Gothenburg, Sweden	34th	Marathon	2:24:52
2007	World Championships	Osaka, Japan	34th	Marathon	2:29:21
