= Ayele Seteng =

Israeli long-distance runner

Ayele Seteng (Hebrew: איילה סטנג; born 11 April 1955) is an Ethiopian-born Israeli long-distance runner who specializes in the marathon.

== Biography ==
Ayele Seteng (also transliterated as Haile Satayin) was born and raised in Ethiopia. He is of Beta Israel heritage. In 1991 he immigrated to Israel.Seteng is 1.69 m (5 ft 6 1/2 in) tall and weighs 54 kilograms (119 lb).

== Athletic career ==
Seteng won national Israeli titles before competing internationally. He achieved his personal best times on the track during the mid-1990s: 14:00.49 in the 5000 metres, achieved in 1996; and 29:04.08 in the 10,000 metres, achieved in 1995. He later converted fully to road running, and to some extent cross-country running.

He competed at the World Cross Country Championships in 1997, 1999 and 2000 without any success. One of his first marathons took place at the 2002 European Championships, where he finished 32nd. In 2004 he finished 12th at the 2004 World Half Marathon Championships and 20th at the 2004 Olympic Games. In 2005 he finished 26th at the 2005 World Half Marathon Championships, and 21st at the 2005 World Championships. He finished 18th at the 2006 European Championships, 19th at the 2007 World Championships and 69th at the 2008 Olympic Games.

At 49 years and 141 days, competing on behalf of Israel at the 2004 Summer Olympics, he was the oldest track and field athlete competing at the 2004 Olympics. At 53 years and 136 days, competing on behalf of Israel at the 2008 Summer Olympics in Beijing, China, he was the oldest athlete competing at the 2008 Olympics. He is reported to have once said "My age is old, but my heart is young."

His personal best times on the road are 1:03:43 in the half marathon, achieved in March 1997 in Tel Aviv; and 2:14:21 in the marathon, achieved in October 2003 in the Venice Marathon. Both these results are Israeli records.

"Running Movie" (Original title in Hebrew: Seret Ratz), a documentary directed by Omer Peled and produced by Gidi Avivi in 2011, follows Ayele Seteng, the oldest marathon runner to compete in the 2008 Summer Olympics in Beijing, and reveals his efforts to participate in the 2012 Summer Olympics in London.

== See also ==
- List of Israeli records in athletics
