= Vadim Bavikin =

USSR-born Israeli javelin thrower

Personal information
- Native name: Вадим Бавыкин
- National team: Israel
- Citizenship: Israeli, Soviet
- Born: October 4, 1970 (age 55) Soviet Union

Sport
- Sport: Athletics
- Event: Javelin throw

Achievements and titles
- Personal best: 81.94 metres (June 2004, Zaragoza)

Vadim Bavikin (Russian: Вадим Бавыкин; born 4 October 1970) is a USSR-born Israeli javelin thrower.

He was originally a Soviet citizen, and went to a boarding school for talented athletes there. He emigrated to Israel in 1990.

He finished tenth for Israel at the 1991 World Championships in Tokyo. He later competed at the World Championships in 1993, 2001, 2003 and 2005. He competed as well for Israel at the 1992 Olympics in Barcelona without reaching the final round.

In 1994, Bavikin tested positive for steroids in a blood test. He was banned for almost four years.

His personal best throw is 81.94 metres, achieved in June 2004 in Zaragoza, Spain. This is the Israeli record.

== Achievements ==
Year	Competition	Venue	Position	Notes
Representing Israel
1991	World Championships	Tokyo, Japan	10th	77.18 m
1993	World Championships	Stuttgart, Germany	16th	76.98 m
2001	World Championships	Edmonton, Canada	22nd	77.91 m
2002	European Championships	Munich, Germany	19th	77.73 m
2003	World Championships	Paris, France	13th	77.06 m
2005	World Championships	Helsinki, Finland	28th	66.74 m
2006	European Championships	Gothenburg, Sweden	24th	66.93 m

== Seasonal bests by year ==
- 1988 - 63.80
- 1989 - 69.70
- 1990 - 70.80
- 1991 - 81.56
- 1992 - 77.30
- 1993 - 78.48
- 1994 - 67.16
- 1998 - 76.45
- 1999 - 76.80
- 2000 - 80.48
- 2001 - 80.54
- 2002 - 81.68
- 2003 - 80.95
- 2004 - 81.94
- 2005 - 77.57
- 2006 - 77.13
- 2007 - 73.51

== IAAF controversy ==
Vadim Bavikin emigrated to Israel in 1990. International Amateur Athletic Federation (IAAF) requires an emigrating citizen to live for three years in a new country before competing. However, the president of the Soviet track and field federation, Igor Ter-Ovanesyan, signed an agreement that allowed recent Soviet emigres to Israel to compete after just one year of residence.

The agreement enabled Israel to add three athletes — Igor Avrunin in the shot-put and discus, Vadim Bavikin in the javelin and Vladimir Ostrovskiy in the 20-kilometer walk — to its team of Rogel Nachum (men's triple jump) and Orit Kolodni (women's 200 and 400 meters).

Thanks to this agreement Vadim Bavikin was able to participate at the 1991 World Championship in Tokyo and the 1992 Olympics in Barcelona.

== See also ==
- List of Israeli records in athletics
- List of Maccabiah records in athletics
