= Asaf Bimro =

Israeli long-distance runner

Personal information
- Native name: אסף בימרו
- National team: Israel
- Citizenship: Israeli, Ethiopian (until 1984)
- Born: January 1, 1969 (age 57) Ethiopia

Sport
- Sport: Athletics
- Long-distance running: Marathon

Asaf Bimro (Hebrew: אסף בימרו; born 1 January 1969) is a retired Israeli long-distance runner who specialized in the marathon.

He was an Ethiopian citizen until 1984 when he emigrated to Israel. His best finishes at the European or World Championships has been a 20th place at the 2002 European Championships, an 18th place at the 2001 World Championships and a 25th place at the 2006 European Championships. He also competed at the 1995 World Championships (without finishing the race), the 1997 World Championships, the 2003 World Championships, the 2004 Olympic Games, the 2005 World Championships, the 2005 World Half Marathon Championships and the 2007 World Championships.

His personal best times are 29:49.85 minutes in the 10,000 metres, achieved in May 1992 in Tel Aviv; 1:04:47 hours in the half marathon, achieved in March 1997 in Tel Aviv; and 2:14:52 hours in the marathon, achieved at the 2003 World Championships in Paris.

== Achievements ==
Year	Competition	Venue	Position	Event	Notes
Representing Israel
1995	World Championships	Gothenburg, Sweden	—	Marathon	DNF
1997	World Championships	Athens, Greece	59th	Marathon	2:37:45
2001	World Championships	Edmonton, Canada	20th	Marathon	2:22:36
2003	World Championships	Paris, France	27th	Marathon	2:14:52
2004	Olympic Games	Athens, Greece	59th	Marathon	2:25:26
2006	European Championships	Gothenburg, Sweden	25th	Marathon	2:19:40
2007	World Championships	Osaka, Japan	40th	Marathon	2:31:34
