= 1976 World Championships in Athletics =

International sporting event

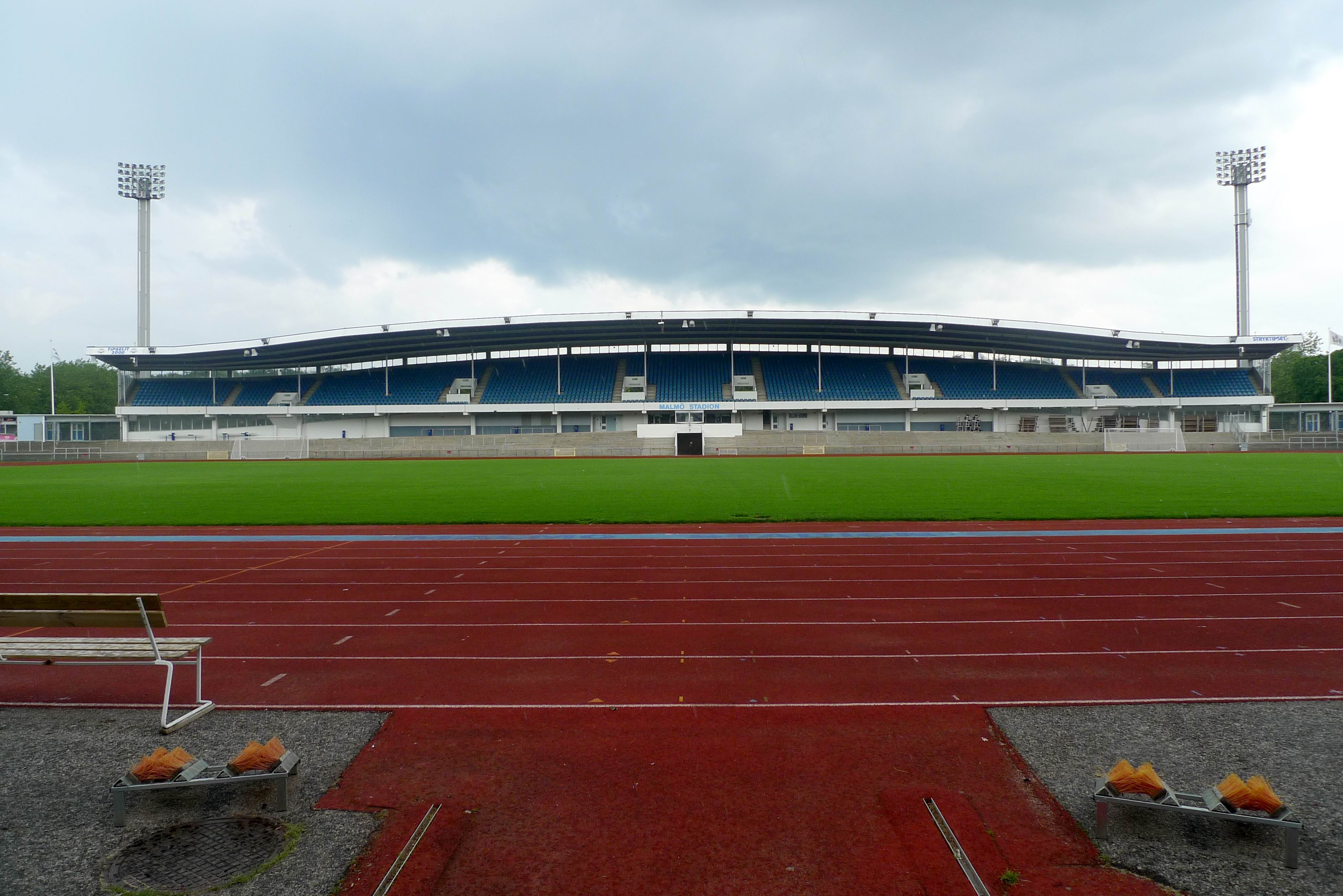
- The race started and finished in Malmö Stadion
- Host city: Malmö, Sweden
- Nations: 20
- Athletes: 42
- Events: 1 – men's 50 km walk
- Dates: 18 September 1976
- Opened by: King Carl XVI Gustaf
- Main venue: Malmö Stadion

The 1976 World Championships in Athletics (Swedish: Världsmästerskapen i friidrott 1976) was the first global, international athletics competition organised by the International Association of Athletics Federations (IAAF). Hosted on 18 September 1976 in Malmö, Sweden, it featured just one event: a men's 50 kilometres race walk contest. The course passed through the streets of the city and the start and finish points were within Malmö Stadion.

== Summary ==
The International Olympic Committee had decided to drop the men's 50 km walk from the Olympic athletics programme for the 1976 Montreal Olympics, despite its constant presence at the games since 1932. The IAAF chose to host its own world championship event instead, a month and a half after the Olympics.

It was the first World Championships that the IAAF had hosted separate from the Olympic Games (traditionally the main championship for the sport) and race winner Soviet athlete Veniamin Soldatenko (runner-up at the 1972 Olympics) became the first ever IAAF world champion and at 37 years and 258 days he remains the oldest male athlete to win that accolade. Mexico's Enrique Vera came second and Finnish walker Reima Salonen was third. A total of 42 walkers representing 20 countries entered the championships race and 37 finished, with four failed to finish and one being disqualified.

This marked the beginning of a move away from this arrangement as a 1976 IAAF Council meeting decided that the organisation would host its own, full-programme, championships on a quadrennial basis. The two-race 1980 World Championships in Athletics filled in for the lack of a women's 400 metres hurdles and 3000 metres run at the 1980 Moscow Olympics. The competition came of age at the 41-event 1983 World Championships in Athletics, which is considered the first edition proper.

== Records ==
Standing records prior to the 1976 World Athletics Championships
World record	Bernd Kannenberg (FRG)	3:52:45	27 May 1972	Bremen, West Germany
Championship record	New event			

== Results ==
Rank	Name	Nationality	Time	Notes
1st place, gold medalist(s)	Veniamin Soldatenko	Soviet Union	3:54:40	CR
2nd place, silver medalist(s)	Enrique Vera	Mexico	3:58:14	
3rd place, bronze medalist(s)	Reima Salonen	Finland	3:58:53	
4	Domingo Colín	Mexico	4:00:34	
5	Matthias Kröl	East Germany	4:00:58	
6	Yevgeniy Lyungin	Soviet Union	4:04:36	
7	Paolo Grecucci	Italy	4:04:59	
8	Ralf Knütter	East Germany	4:05:41	
9	Gerhard Weidner	West Germany	4:06:20	
10	Yevgeniy Yevsyukov	Soviet Union	4:07:14	
11	Bogusław Kmiecik	Poland	4:09:30	
12	Steffan Müller	East Germany	4:10:17	
13	Bob Dobson	Great Britain & N.I.	4:10:20	
14	Agustí Jorba Argentí	Spain	4:11:04	
15	Lennart Lundgren	Sweden	4:11:43	
16	Heinrich Schubert	West Germany	4:11:55	
17	Franco Vecchio	Italy	4:12:14	
18	Bohdan Bułakowski	Poland	4:13:20	
19	Hans Binder	West Germany	4:13:49	
20	Seppo Immonen	Finland	4:15:28	
21	Larry Young	United States	4:16:47	
22	Willy Sawall	Australia	4:18:27	
23	Timothy Ericsson	Australia	4:20:23	
24	Ferenc Danovszky	Hungary	4:22:36	
25	Stefan Ingvarsson	Sweden	4:26:45	
26	Lucien Faber	Luxembourg	4:26:48	
27	August Hirt	United States	4:28:35	
28	Pat Farrelly	Canada	4:29:54	
29	Robin Whyte	Australia	4:30:08	
30	Shaul Ladany	Israel	4:33:02	
31	Claude Saurriat	France	4:34:57	
32	Roy Thorpe	Great Britain & N.I.	4:35:57	
33	Glen Sweazey	Canada	4:36:00	
34	Max Grob	Switzerland	4:38:08	
35	Nico Schroten	Netherlands	4:42:53	
36	Helmut Bueck	Canada	4:50:52	
37	Henry Klein	U.S. Virgin Islands	5:09:04	
	Gérard Lelièvre	France	DNF	
	Carl Lawton	Great Britain & N.I.	DNF	
	Fred Godwin	United States	DNF	
	Vittorio Visini	Italy	DNF	
	Bengt Simonsen	Sweden	DQ	

== Participation ==
- Australia (3)
- Canada (3)
- East Germany (3)
- Finland (2)
- France (2)
- Great Britain (3)
- Hungary (1)
- Israel (1)
- Italy (3)
- Luxembourg (1)
- Mexico (2)
- Netherlands (1)
- Poland (2)
- Soviet Union (3)
- Spain (1)
- Sweden (3)
- Switzerland (1)
- United States (3)
- United States Virgin Islands (1)
- West Germany (3)
