= Maccabiah Games =

International Jewish multi-sport event

Maccabiah Games הַמַּכַּבִּיָּה

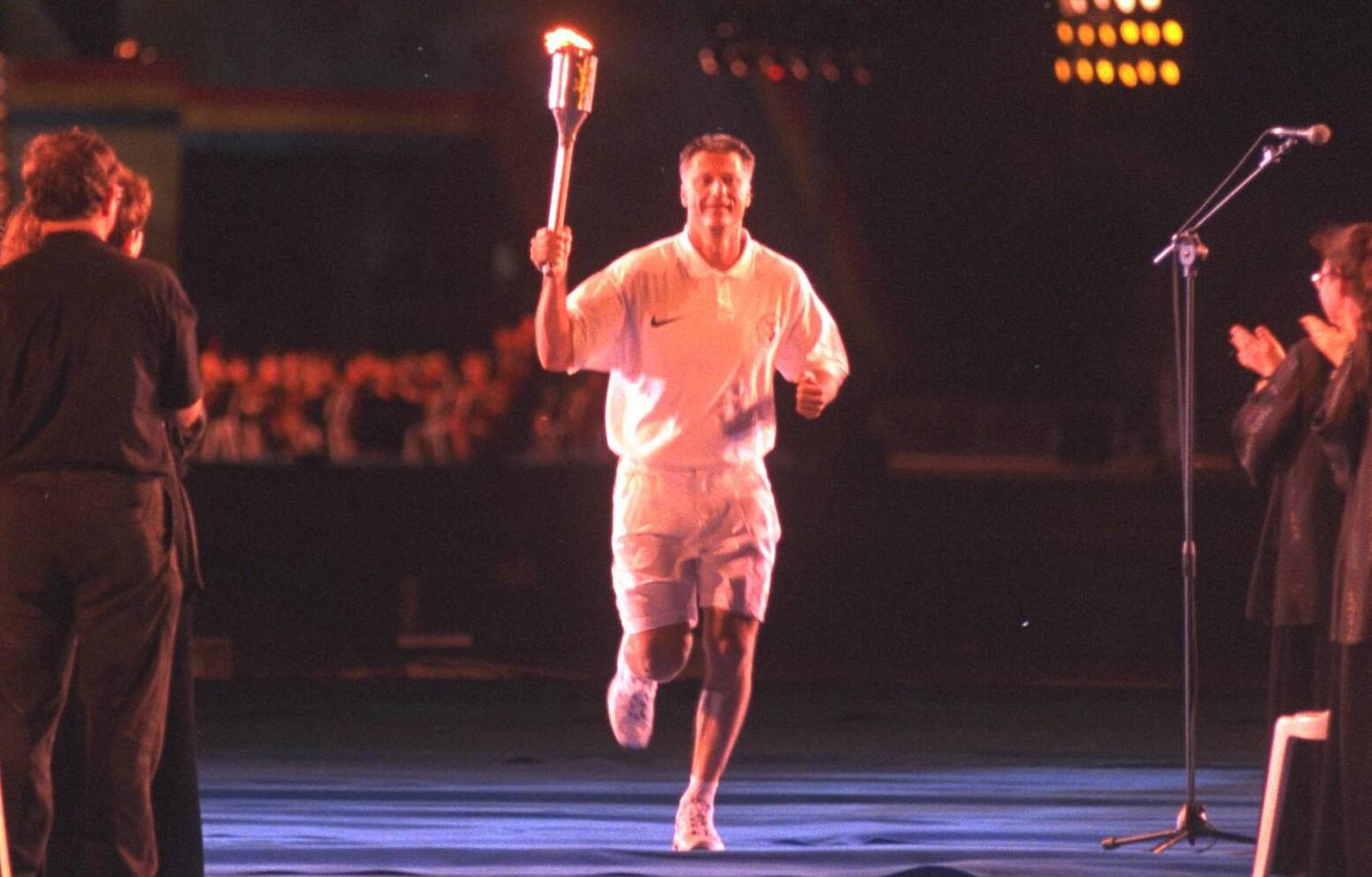
- Miki Berkovich carrying the torch
- Status: Active
- Genre: Multi-sport event
- Frequency: Quadrennial
- Location: Israel
- Established: 1932
- Most recent: 2026
- Organizer: Maccabi World Union
- Website: www.maccabiah.com

The Maccabiah Games (Hebrew: הַמַּכַּבִּיָּה, Ha-Maccabiah), often referred to as simply the Maccabiah or the "Jewish Olympics", is a quadrennial multi-sport competition held in Israel in which Jewish athletes from around the world and Israeli citizens compete. Participants represent their respective national delegations in both individual and team events

Organized by the Maccabi World Union, the First Maccabiah was held in 1932 in Tel Aviv during the British mandate. The Maccabiah Games were declared a "Regional Sports Event" by, and under the auspices and supervision of, the International Olympic Committee in 1961.

The 22nd and most recent Maccabiah Games were held from 30 June to 14 July 2026, having been postponed from an original July 2025 date due to the Twelve-Day War between Iran and Israel. More than 8,000 athletes from approximately 55 countries competed in 45 sports.

== Games ==
Originally, the Maccabiah was held every three years. Since the 1953 Maccabiah Games, the event has generally been held every four years, in the year following the Olympic Games.

The Maccabiah Games are open to Jewish athletes from around the world, as well as to all Israeli athletes regardless of ethnicity or religion.

Competitions at the Maccabiah are organized into four divisions: open (seniors), juniors, masters, and disabled. The Games are organized by the Maccabi World Union.

== Etymology ==
The name Maccabiah was chosen after Judah Maccabee, a Jewish leader who defended his country from King Antiochus. Modi'in, Judah's birthplace, is also the starting location of the torch that lights the flames at the opening ceremony, a tradition that started at the 4th Maccabiah.

== History ==
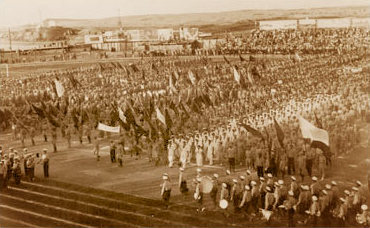
First Maccabiah Games

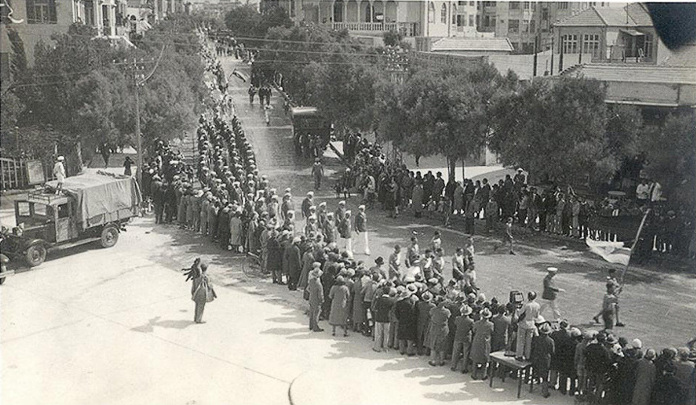
Delegations in the streets of Tel Aviv during the parade of the 1st Maccabiah.

The Maccabiah Games were the result of a proposal put forward by Yosef Yekutieli in 1929 at the Maccabi World Congress. Yekutieli, who heard about the Stockholm Olympics, wanted to form a representation for Eretz Yisrael. Following the appointment of the new British Palestine High Commissioner, Sir Arthur Grenfell Wauchope, the Maccabiah got the go-ahead.

The 1st Maccabiah opened on March 28, 1932. The Maccabiah Stadium in Tel Aviv, which was built with donations, was filled to capacity. Roughly 400 athletes from 18 countries took part in everything from swimming, football, and handball, to various athletics. In the first Games, the Polish delegation took first place.

The Maccabiah Games were intended to take place at an interval of three years. Following the success of the first Games, the 2nd Maccabiah was held from April 2 to 10, 1935, despite official opposition by the British Mandatory government. Over 1,300 athletes from 28 nations participated. The 3rd Maccabiah, which was originally scheduled for spring of 1938, was postponed until 1950 due to British concerns of large-scale illegal immigration, World War II, and the 1948 Arab–Israeli War. It became the first Maccabiah to be held after the establishment of the State of Israel.

Starting from the 4th Maccabiah, the games were changed to take place every four years in the year following the Olympics and since 1953, the Games have taken place every four years, with the exception of the 21st Maccabiah, which was postponed for one year due to the COVID-19 pandemic. The 15th edition was marred by what became known as the Maccabiah bridge disaster, when a temporary bridge built for the march of athletes at the opening ceremony collapsed, plunging about 100 members of the Australian delegation into the waters of the Yarkon River. Four athletes were killed, and 63 injured. More than 5,000 participants from over 50 countries competed in those Games.

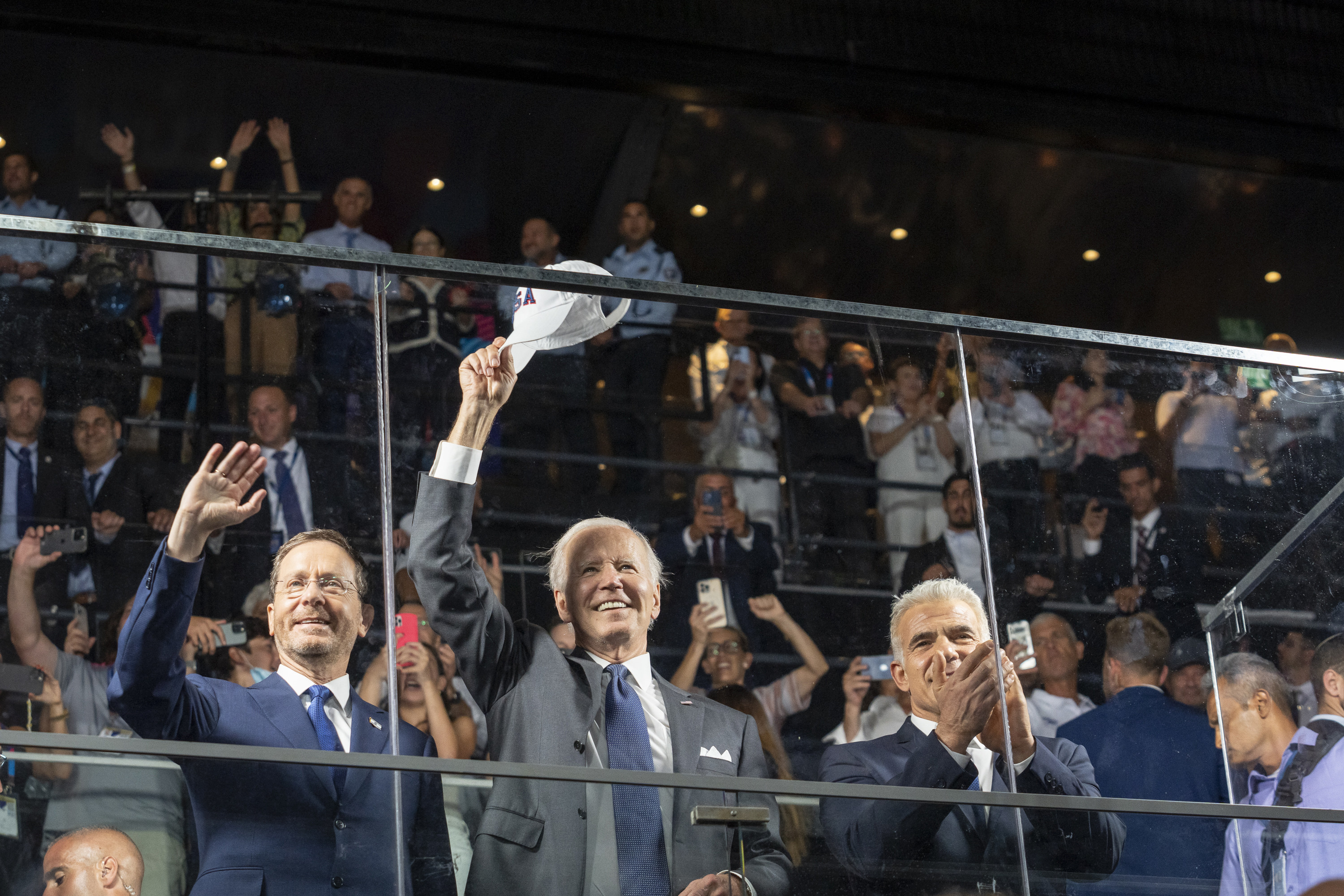
US President Joe Biden, together with President Issac Herzog and Prime Minister Yair Lapid, at the Opening Ceremonies of the 2022 Maccabiah Games.

Over the last two decades, the number of participants grew to 9,000 athletes in the 19th Maccabiah, from 78 countries, making it the 3rd-largest sporting event in the world and the second largest sporting event in 2013, behind the 2013 Summer Universiade. It is a forum for Jewish athletes to meet and convene, and provides the athletes with opportunities to explore Israel and Jewish history.

Approximately 10,000 athletes, from 80 countries, were expected to compete in 42 sports categories in the 21st Maccabaiah. It was reportedly the world's largest sporting event in 2022. President of the United States Joe Biden attended the opening ceremonies, cheering on the U.S. delegation of 1,400 athletes—larger than the U.S. delegation to the 2021 Tokyo Olympics. This made him the first American president to attend the Maccabiah Games.

== Editions of World Maccabiah ==
The following is an overview of the Games:

=== Summer Maccabiah ===
#	Year	Date	Main Venue	Nations	Athletes	Sports	Ref
1	1932	28 Mar–6 Apr	Maccabiah Stadium	27	390	16	
2	1935	2–10 Apr	Maccabiah Stadium	28	1,250	18	
3	1950	28 Sep–11 Oct	Ramat Gan Stadium	20	800	17	
4	1953	22–29 Sep	Ramat Gan Stadium	22	892	19	
5	1957	15–24 Sep	Ramat Gan Stadium	20	980	19	
6	1961	29 Aug–5 Sep	Ramat Gan Stadium	27	1,000	20	
7	1965	23–31 Aug	Ramat Gan Stadium	27	1,200	22	
8	1969	28 Jul–7 Aug	Ramat Gan Stadium	27	1,450	22	
9	1973	9–19 July	Ramat Gan Stadium	26	1,500	23	
10	1977	12–21 July	Ramat Gan Stadium	34	2,700	26	
11	1981	6–16 July	Ramat Gan Stadium	34	3,450	30	
12	1985	15–25 July	Ramat Gan Stadium	37	3,700	28	
13	1989	3–13 July	Ramat Gan Stadium	45	4,400	32	
14	1993	5–15 July	Ramat Gan Stadium	48	5,100		
15	1997	14–24 July	Ramat Gan Stadium	33	5,500	34	
16	2001	16–23 July	Teddy Stadium	49	2,200		
17	2005	11–23 July	Ramat Gan Stadium	55	7,300		
18	2009	13–23 July	Ramat Gan Stadium	55	7,510	33	
19	2013	18–30 July	Teddy Stadium	77	7,500	34	
20	2017	4–17 July	Teddy Stadium	85	10,000	45	
21	2022	12–26 July	Teddy Stadium	80	10,000	47	
22	2026	29 June–14 July	Teddy Stadium	45	8,000	32	

=== Winter Maccabiah ===
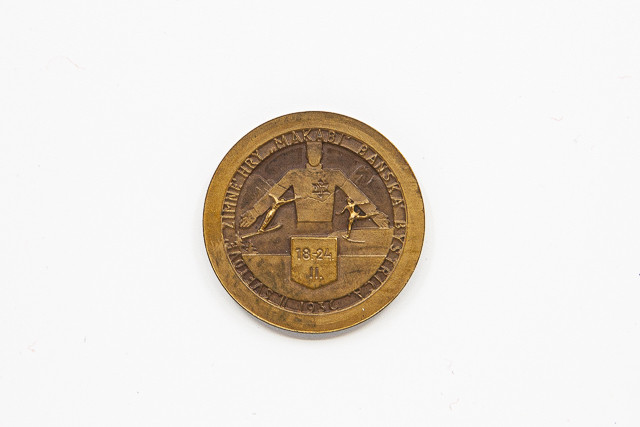
Bronze medal from the winter games in Banska Bystrica, 1936, in the Jewish Museum of Switzerland's collection.

Prior to World War II there was an attempt to organize a winter Maccabiah. Due to the relatively warm temperatures in British Mandate Palestine, the winter Maccabiot were organized in European nations. The 1st Winter Maccabiah was held in Zakopane, Poland, February 2 to 5, 1933. The games were met with great opposition; the Gazeta Warszawska newspaper encouraged Polish youth to intervene during the games to prevent the "Jewification of Polish winter sports venues".

A second attempt at the winter games was relatively successful. The 2nd Winter Maccabiah took place February 18 to 22, 1936, in Banská Bystrica (then Czechoslovakia). At the games, 2,000 athletes from 12 nations participated.

For 85 years, these were the only winter Maccabiah games to be held and the only two Maccabiot that did not take place in the Land of Israel. During these years, the Maccabi did run smaller regional winter games. Then, the 3rd Winter Maccabiah took place from January 1 to 9, 2023, in Ruhpolding, Germany. At the games, 400 athletes from 20 nations participated.

#	Year	Host	Athletes	Nations
1	1933	(Poland) Zakopane	250	8
2	1936	(Czechoslovakia) Banská Bystrica	2,000	12
3	2023	(Germany) Ruhpolding	400	20

== Participating nations ==
Countries that participated in the 19th Maccabiah (2013) Past participants

The Maccabiah Games have expanded significantly since their inception, evolving from a small regional gathering into an international event hosting thousands of athletes from over 80 countries. Participation reflects the global breadth of the Jewish diaspora, with consistent delegations from North America, Europe, South America, and Israel.

Historically, participation has fluctuated due to geopolitical factors. Early editions included delegations from several Arab nations as well as Iran.

== Ceremonies ==
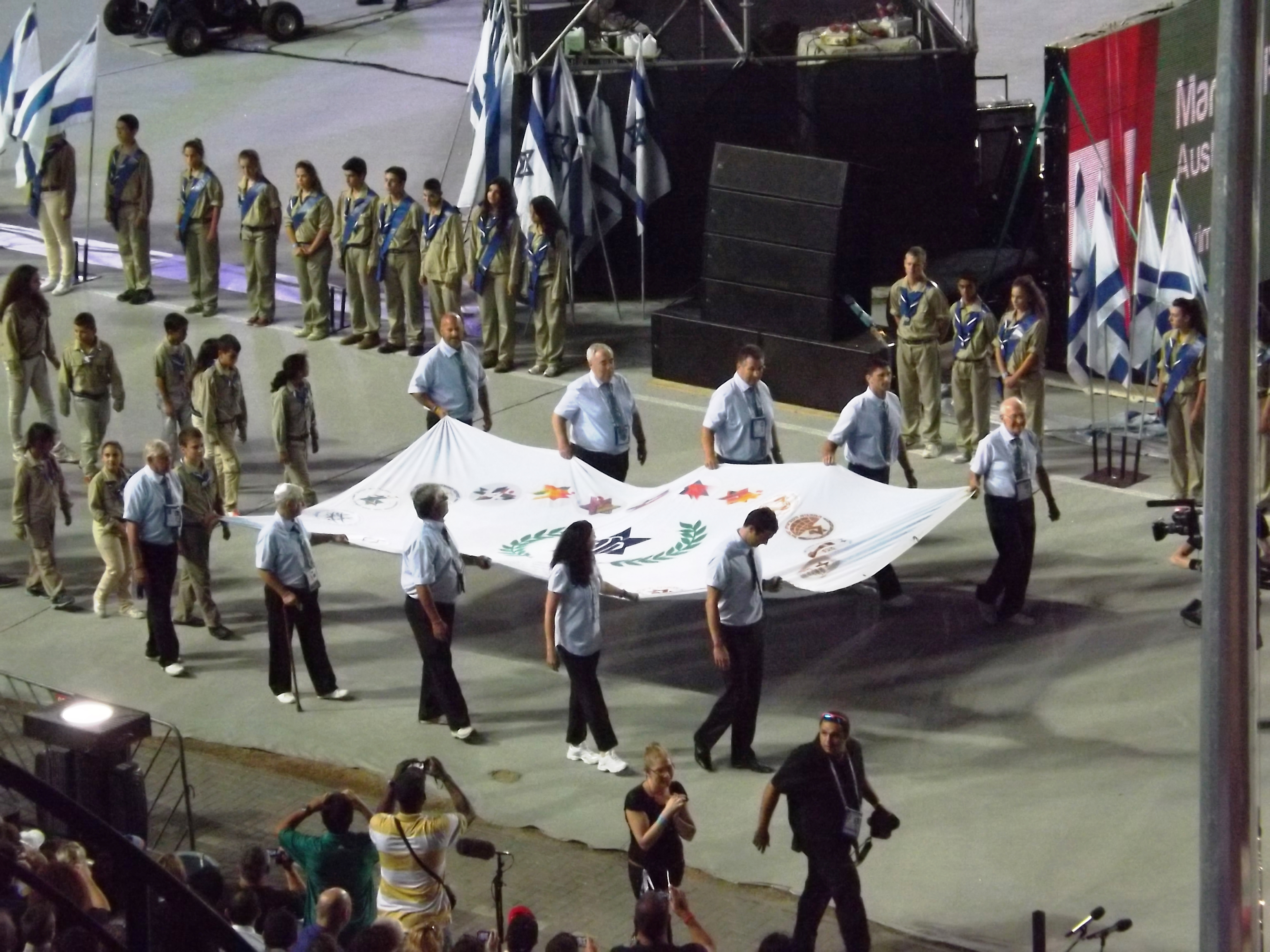
The World Maccabi Movement flag during the opening ceremony of the 19th Maccabiah.

The Maccabiah ceremonies are two ceremonial events that take place during the first and last days of the Maccabiah games. The ceremonies are an important part of the Jewish culture in Israel and the Zionist movement. The ceremonies of the Maccabiah trace their roots to the Olympic Games of the early 20th century. As such, they share many similarities.

The Maccabiah opening ceremony, which is organized by the Maccabi World Union, has recently been presented in English, Hebrew, and Spanish.

=== Opening ===
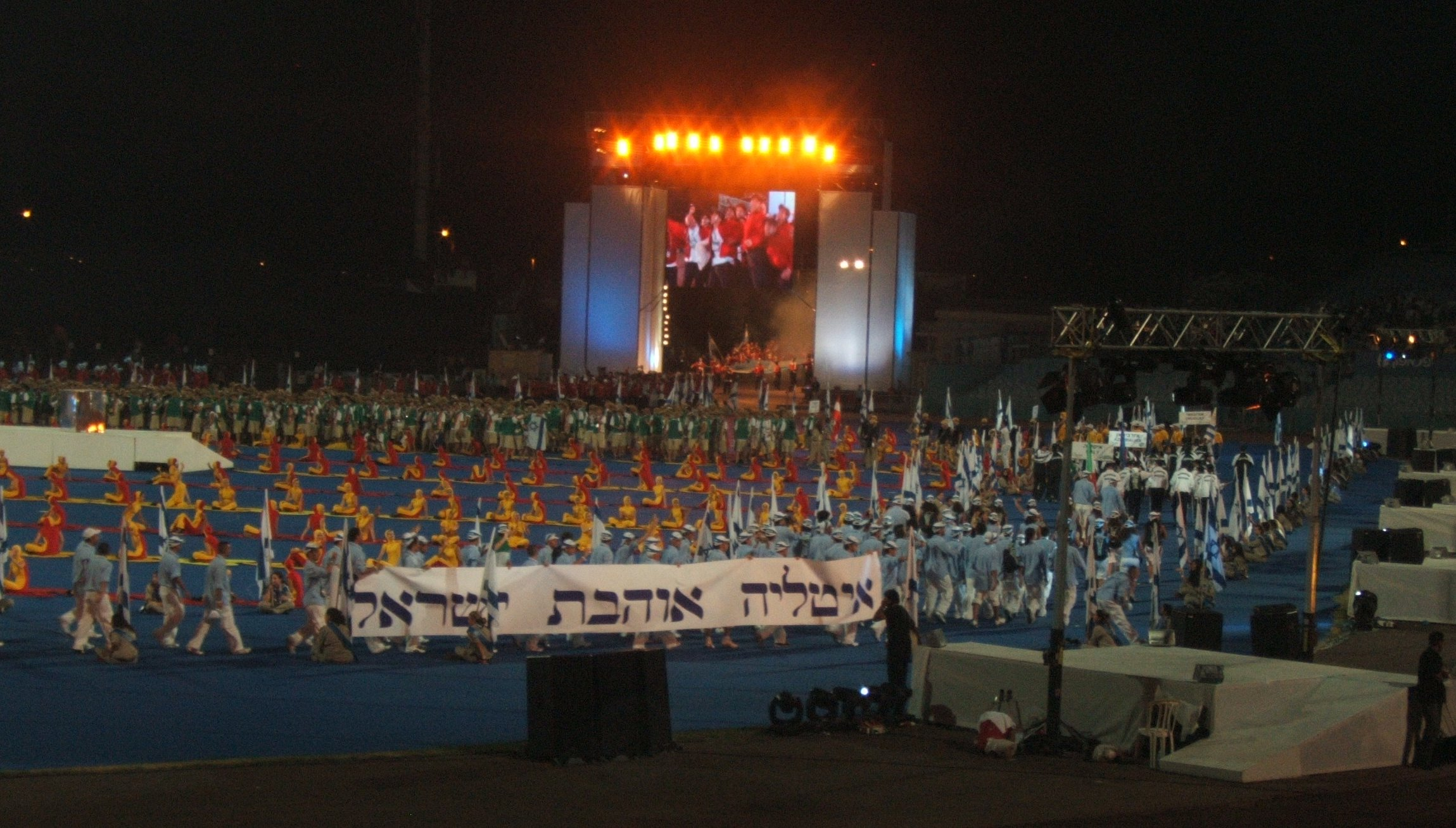
Opening ceremony of the 17th Maccabiah.

The opening ceremonies represent the official commencement of the Maccabiah. Some sports however, such as golf and rugby, might start prior to the opening ceremonies in order to finish on time.

The opening ceremony for the first Games was held at the new Maccabiah Stadium. The Stadium, which is located next to the Yarkon River in Tel Aviv, was finished just the night before. The Stadium also hosted the 2nd Maccabiah in 1935. For the 3rd Maccabiah, the opening ceremony took place in a new stadium in Ramat Gan. The stadium has been hosting the opening ceremonies of the Maccabiah ever since, with the exception of the 16th, 19th, and 20th Maccabiah Games which were held in Teddy Stadium, Jerusalem.

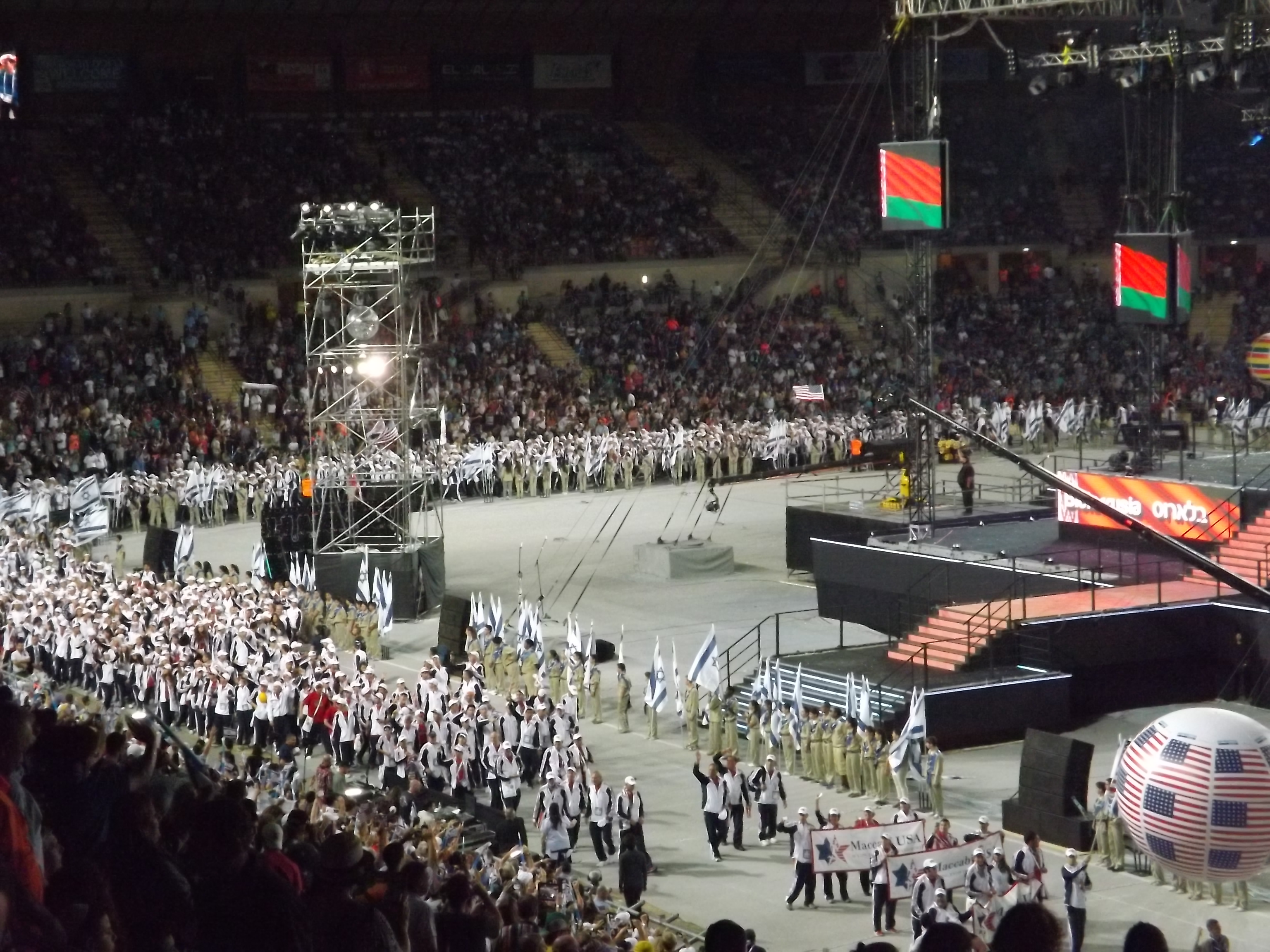
The United States delegation to the 19th Maccabiah; with 1,106 people, the second-largest delegation (after Israel).

The ceremonies often start with the introduction of the active participants of the Maccabi youth movement. After the parade of nations, the opening ceremony continues on with a presentation of artistic displays of music, singing, dance, and theater representative of the Jewish culture. In recent games, Jewish singers from around the world participated in the opening ceremony. For example, in 2013, Grammy Award-winner Miri Ben-Ari and X Factor USA finalist Carly Rose Sonenclar performed at the opening ceremony.

==== Parade of Nations ====
Just like at the Olympics, the Maccabiah starts out with a "Parade of Nations", during which most participating athletes march into the stadium, country by country. The countries enter the stadium in accordance with the Hebrew alphabet. The parade of nations, in contrast to some other games, include junior and disabled athletes who also partake in the competitions. In accordance with the Maccabiah's tradition, the Israeli delegation always enters last.

=== Closing ===
The closing ceremony of the Maccabiah Games takes place after all sporting events have concluded. Typically, a member of Maccabi or some other well-known figure makes the closing speech and the Games officially close. The ceremony includes large artistic displays of music, singing, and dance. Various Jewish singers perform during the closing ceremony. In recent years, the closing ceremonies included popular musicians and live music and dancing.

=== Medal presentation ===
A medal ceremony is held after each Maccabiah event is concluded. The winner, second, and third-place competitors or teams stand on top of a three-tiered rostrum to be awarded their respective medals. Medals are awarded by an official Maccabi member.

=== Ceremony hosts ===
Year	Hosts(s)
1981	Azaria Rapoport (Closing)
2005	Becky Griffin • Rodrigo Gonzales
2009	Galit Giat • Michael HarPaz
2013	Miri Nevo • Dana Grotsky
2017	Noa Tishby • Miri Nevo (Opening); Bar Refaeli (Closing)
2022	Yael Bar Zohar • Niv Raskin (Opening)
2026	Montana Tucker • Michael HarPaz (Opening)

== Sports ==
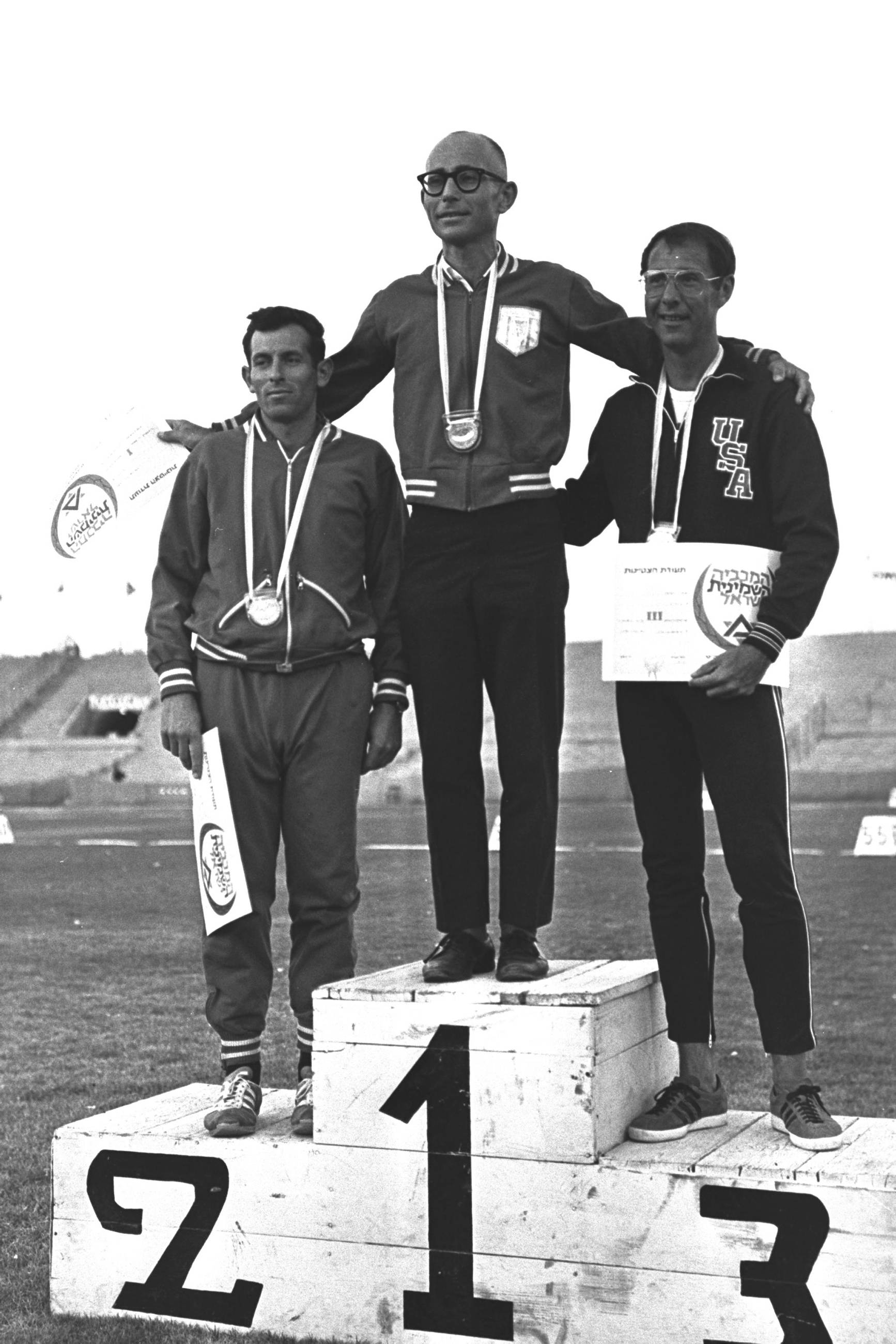
Shaul Ladany (center), winner of the 10 kilometre walk, on podium during 8th Maccabiah Games at Ramat Gan Stadium (1969).

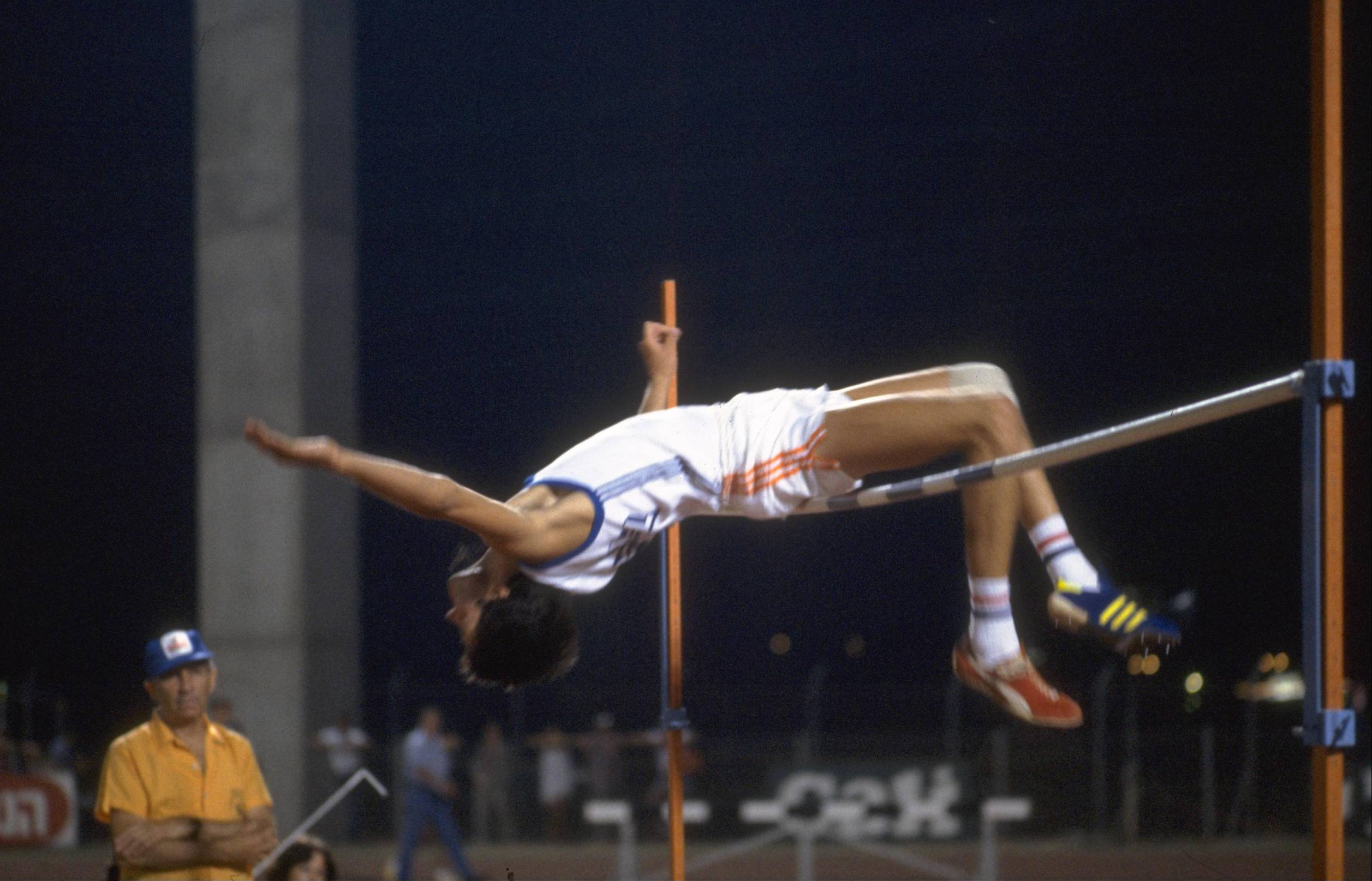
Israeli high jumping champion Gideon Harmat, a silver medalist at the 11th Maccabiah.

The Maccabiah Games recognize all 28 current Olympic sports, plus a number of other sports such as chess, cricket, and netball. In contrast with the Olympic Games and other major international sporting events, the Maccabiah rules regarding accepting new sports are very lenient. New sports are accepted to the Maccabiah Games provided that competitions will only take place if at least four delegations bring competitors for that sport (three in the case of female sports, as well as the junior divisions). As a result, the Maccabiah has held various unique competitions such as duplicate bridge.

Karate, not yet on the Olympic schedule, made its debut in 1977 at the 10th Maccabiah Games. The requisite number of initial countries signed on and agreed to send delegations. Since 1977, karate has participated uninterrupted. Although at the beginning karate was only contested in the fighting or kumite category, forms or kata was included in 1981. In 1985, women's karate was added. Junior and youth categories made their debut in 2009. The World Karate Federation, a member of the International Olympic Committee (IOC), oversees and supervises the rules of karate competition at the Maccabiah.

The Maccabiah Games are organized into four divisions: Open, Junior, Masters, and Paralympics.

- Open – The Open games are generally unlimited in age, and are intended for the best athletes from each delegation, bound by the governing international rules in each sport.
- Junior – The Junior Maccabiah games are open to any qualifying athlete aged 15–18.
- Masters – The Masters games are for older competitors; they are divided into a number of different age categories.
- Paralympic – The Paralympic games are generally open to all athletes with a range of physical and intellectual disabilities. Past games included Para-cycling, Paralympic swimming, Para table tennis, Half Marathon, and Wheelchair Basketball.

In recent Maccabiot there has been a renewed interest in introducing new sports to the Maccabiah. In the 15th Maccabiah Games, ice hockey was first introduced. Ice hockey was not included in immediately subsequent games, but returned in the 19th Maccabiah. Squash became an official sport in the 10th Maccabiah Games in 1977. The 19th Maccabiah was also granted provisional approval for dressage and jumping competitions from the FEI.

== Notable participants ==
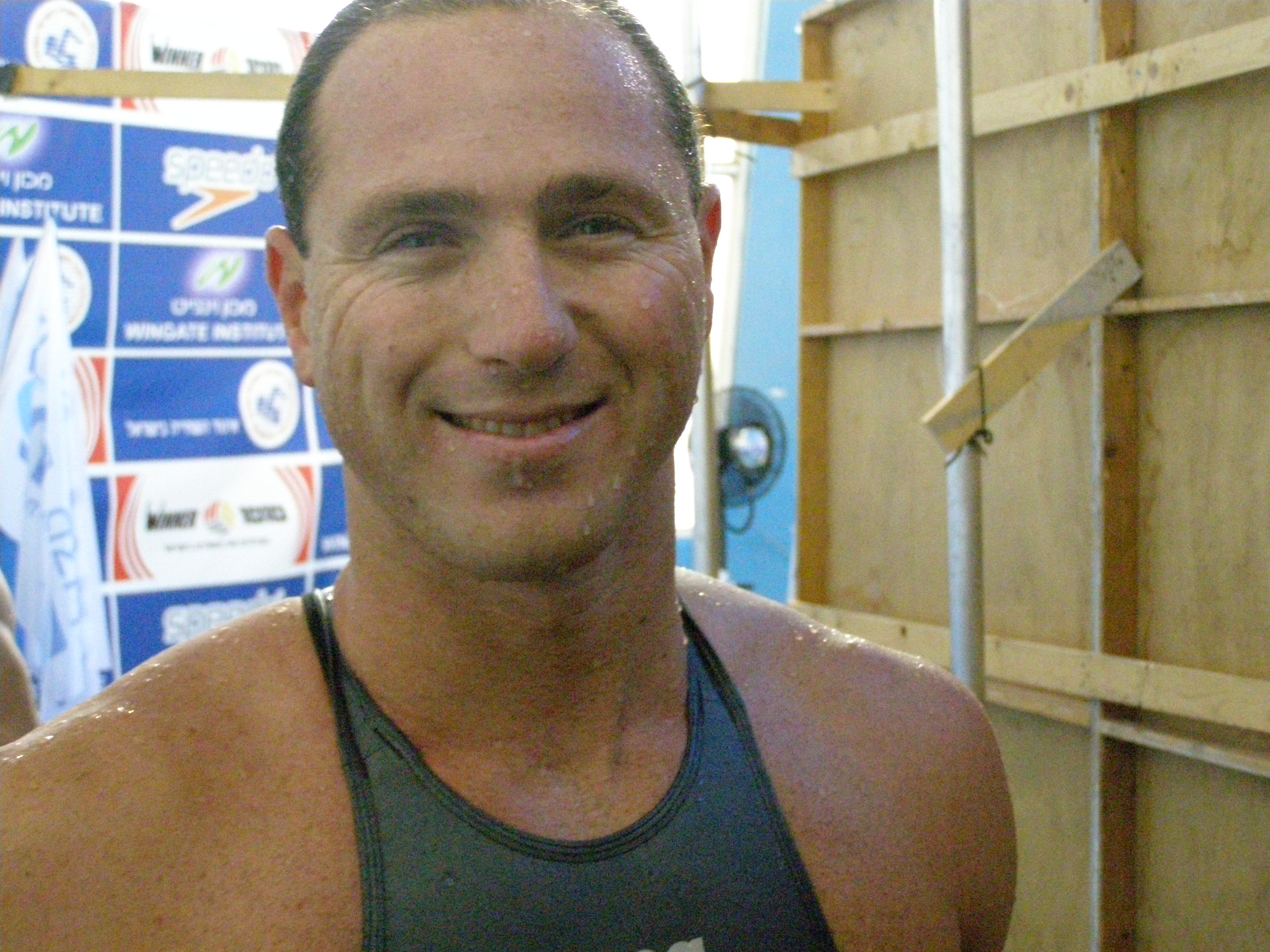
Four-time Olympic gold medalist Jason Lezak at the 2009 Maccabiah Games.

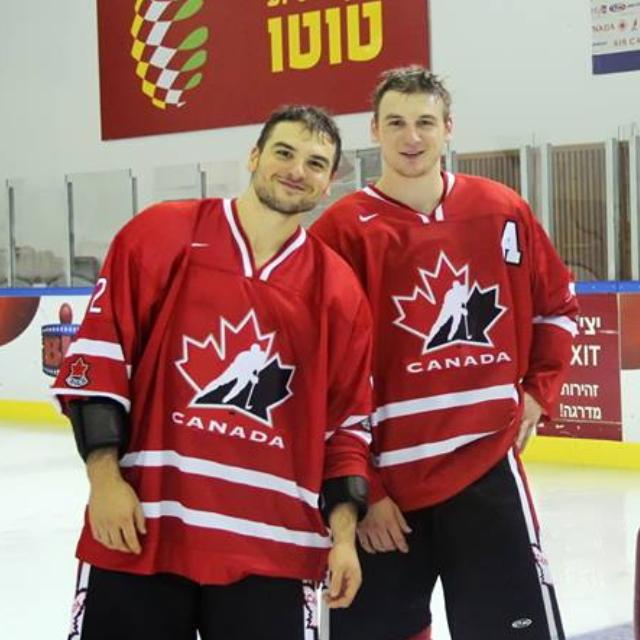
NHL hockey player Zach Hyman at the 2013 Maccabiah Games.

The Maccabiah Games have hosted many world-class athletes, including numerous Olympic gold medalists and world champions.

=== Competitors ===
- Swimming: Mark Spitz, Lenny Krayzelburg, Jason Lezak, Marilyn Ramenofsky, Anthony Ervin
- Gymnastics: Mitch Gaylord, Abie Grossfeld, Ágnes Keleti, Valery Belenky, Linoy Ashram
- Basketball: Larry Brown, Nat Holman, Dolph Schayes, Ernie Grunfeld, Danny Schayes
- Tennis: Angela Buxton, Brad Gilbert, Julie Heldman, Allen Fox, Nicolás Massú, Dick Savitt
- Fencing: Sergey Sharikov, Vadim Gutzeit, Soren Thompson, Mariya Mazina
- Track and Field: Lillian Copeland, Gerry Ashworth, Gary Gubner
- Cricket: Adam Bacher, Dennis Gamsy, Neil Rosendorff, Marshall Rosen, Bob Herman
- Weightlifting: Isaac Berger, Frank Spellman
- Wrestling: Lindsey Durlacher, Jason Goldman, Fred Oberlander, Henry Wittenberg
- Baseball: Max Fried, Dean Kremer
- Football: Marcelo Lipatin, Jeff Agoos, Jonathan Bornstein
- Other sports: Carina Benninga (field hockey), Angelica Rozeanu (table tennis), Boris Gelfand and Judit Polgár (chess), Ori Sasson (judo), Shawn Lipman and Zack Test (rugby), Dov Sternberg (karate); Bruce Fleisher (golf); Donald Spero (rowing)

=== Ambassadors and guests of honor ===
- Kerri Strug, ceremonial torchbearer for the 15th Maccabiah (1997)
- Aly Raisman, ceremonial torchbearer for the 19th Maccabiah (2013)

== Regional Maccabiah ==
=== European Maccabiah ===
#	Year	Host	Athletes
1	1929	(Czechoslovakia) Prague	
2	1930	(Belgium) Antwerp	
3	1959	(Denmark) Copenhagen	
4	1963	(France) Lyon	
5	1979	(United Kingdom) Leicester	
6	1983	(Belgium) Antwerp	
7	1987	(Denmark) Copenhagen	
8	1991	(France) Marseille	
9	1995	(Netherlands) Amsterdam	
10	1999	(United Kingdom) Stirling	
11	2003	(Belgium) Antwerp	
12	2007	(Italy) Rome	1,800
13	2011	(Austria) Vienna	2,000
14	2015	(Germany) Berlin	2,000
15	2019	(Hungary) Budapest	3,000
16	2023		
17	2027		

=== Pan American Maccabi Games ===
Latin American Maccabi's (CLAM), called Jorge Newbery Pan American Maccabi Games or Pan American Maccabiah from 1966:

#	Year	Host
1	1966	(Brazil) São Paulo
2		
3	1976	(Peru) Lima
4	1979	Mexico City
5	1983	(Brazil)
6	1987	(Venezuela) Caracas
7	1991	(Uruguay)
8	1995	(Argentina) Buenos Aires
9	1999	
10	2003	Santiago de Chile
11	2007	(Argentina) Buenos Aires
12	2011	(Brazil) São Paulo
13	2015	(Chile)
14	2019	Mexico City
15	2023	(Argentina) Buenos Aires

=== Oceania Maccabiah (Junior Carnival) ===
The Maccabi Junior Carnivals are a sporting event held for the Jewish youth of Australia or New Zealand. It has been held annually since 1982, usually in January.

Venues were:

City	Years hosted
Sydney	1982, 1986, 1989, 1992, 1995, 1998, 2001, 2005, 2009, 2013, 2016, 2017, 2019
Perth	1983, 1990, 1993, 1997, 2000, 2003, 2006, 2010, 2014
Melbourne	1984, 1991, 1994, 1996, 1999, 2002, 2007, 2011, 2015, 2018
Brisbane	1987, 2012
Adelaide	1988
Auckland	2004, 2008

== See also ==
- Arab Games
- Islamic Solidarity Games
- Maccabi Australia
- Sport in Israel
- Muscular Judaism
- Judenklub
