= 1936 Maccabiah Games =

International winter sports event

2nd Winter Maccabiah
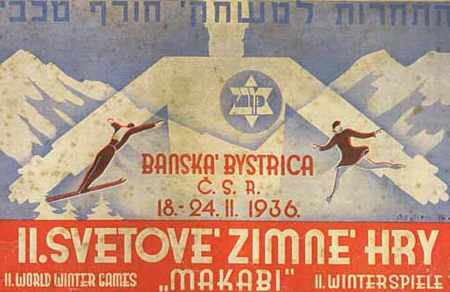
- Poster of the 2nd Winter Maccbiah Games (1936)
- Host city: Banská Bystrica, Czechoslovakia
- Nations: 12
- Athletes: 2,000
- Opening: February 18, 1936
- Closing: February 22, 1936

Summer

Winter

The 2nd Winter Maccabiah (Hebrew: מכביית החורף השנייה) was the second edition of the Winter Maccabiah that took place from February 18 to 22, 1936 in Banská Bystrica, (then Czechoslovakia). Until 2023, the 2nd Winter Maccabiah was the last Winter Maccabiah to be held and the last Maccabiah to be outside of Israel.

== History ==
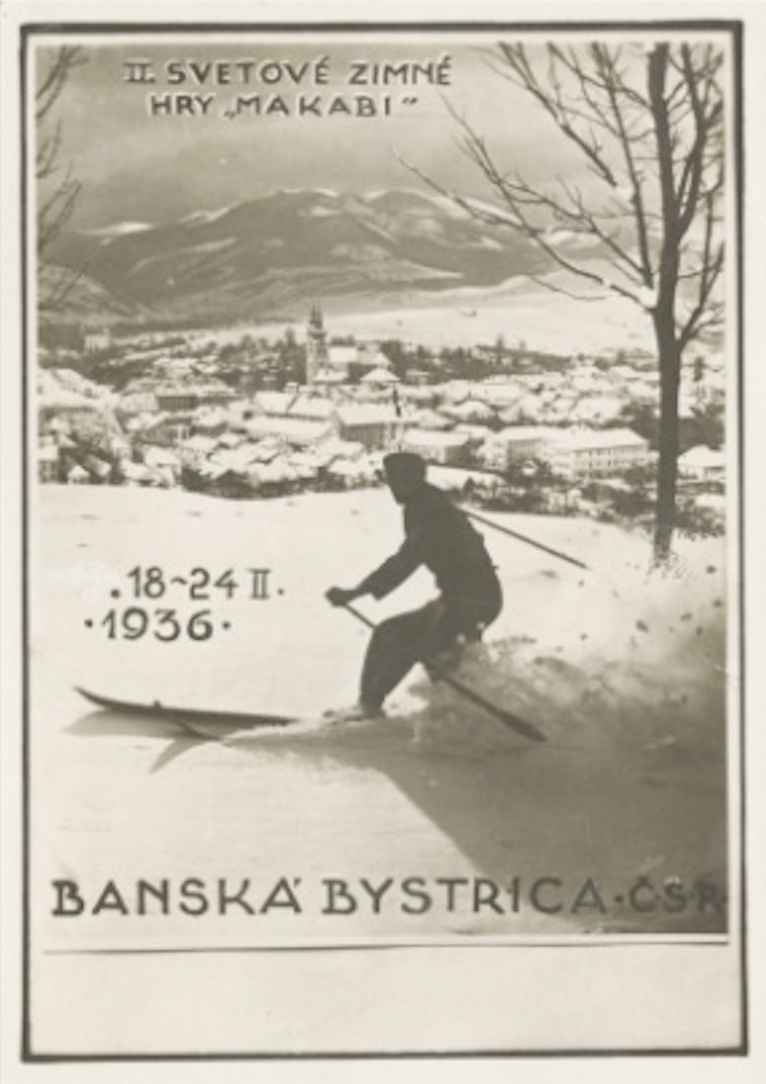
Postcard of the 1936 games

After the 1st Winter Maccabiah which took place in 1933, a second Winter Maccabiah was organized for 1936. Banská Bystrica was chosen to host the Games. Over 2,000 Jewish athletes participated in the games. Following the Germany's annexation of Czechoslovakia in 1939, no further games were ever held. It wasn't until the collapse of Communism in 1989 that new Maccabi clubs were re-established in these areas. In 1996, on the sixtieth anniversary of the 2nd Winter Maccabiah, the Maccabi club of the Jewish community of Banská Bystrica established its own annual commemorative winter games.

== Participating communities ==
12 nations participated.

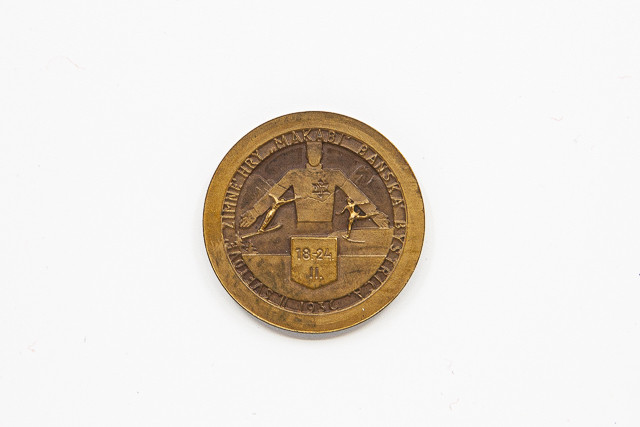
Bronze medal from the winter games in Banska Bystrica, 1936, in the Jewish Museum of Switzerland’s collection.

- Federal State of Austria
- First Czechoslovak Republic
- Free City of Danzig
- Nazi Germany
- Second Polish Republic
- Switzerland
- Yugoslavia
