= Jewish War =

Jewish War can refer to:

- The First Jewish–Roman War of 66–73 AD (see also Jewish–Roman wars)
  - The Jewish War, book about the war by the 1st-century Jewish historian Josephus
- An antisemitic campaign by Polish newspaper Gazeta Warszawska known as The Jewish war of 1859
- Antisemitic canard that Jews cause wars
  - Jewish war conspiracy theory, a conspiracy theory asserting that World War II was caused by Jews
