= Bredt =

Bredt is a surname of German origin. Among those bearing this surname we find:

- Alice Verne-Bredt (1868–1958), English piano teacher, violinist and composer
- Bertha McNamara Bredt (1853–1931), Australian socialist agitator, feminist, pamphleteer, bookseller
- David S. Bredt (born 1964), American molecular neuroscientist
- Ferdinand Max Bredt (1868–1921), German painter
- Irene Sänger-Bredt (1911–1983), German engineer, mathematician and physicist
- Johann Viktor Bredt (1879–1940), German Weimar era justice minister
- Julius Bredt (1855–1937), German organic chemist
