= Ruhpolding =

- Municipality
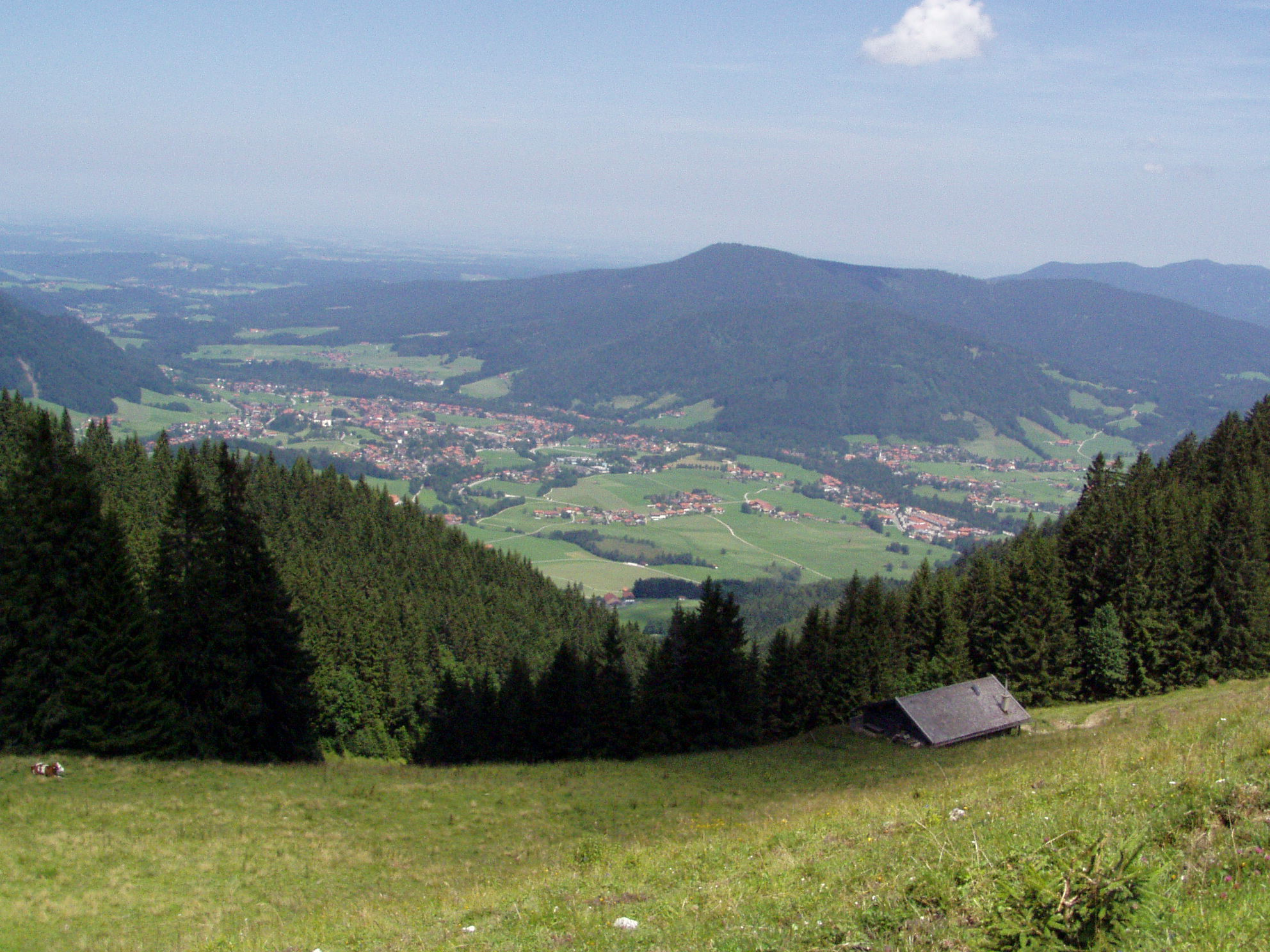
- Ruhpolding in late-July 2005

- Coat of arms

- Location of Ruhpolding within Traunstein district
- Interactive map of Ruhpolding
- Location within Germany Location within Bavaria
- Coordinates: 47°46′N 12°39′E
- Country: Germany
- State: Bavaria
- Admin. region: Oberbayern
- District: Traunstein
- Subdivisions: 55 localities

Government
  - Mayor (2020–26): Justus Pfeifer (CSU/Vereinigung Ruhpoldinger Bürger)

Area
  - Total: 147.83 km^{2} (57.08 sq mi)
- Elevation: 625–1,961 m (2,051–6,434 ft)

Population (2025-12-31)
  - Total: 6,819
  - Density: 46.13/km^{2} (119.5/sq mi)
- Time zone: UTC+01:00 (CET)
  - Summer (DST): UTC+02:00 (CEST)
- Postal codes: 83324
- Dialling codes: 08663
- Vehicle registration: TS
- Website: www.ruhpolding-rathaus.de

Ruhpolding (German pronunciation: [ˈʁuːpɔldɪŋ]) is the municipality with the biggest area of the Traunstein district in southeastern Bavaria, Germany. It is situated in the south of the Chiemgau region in the Alps and next to the Austrian border.

The economy is based on tourism and sports. Major winter sports held in the district include biathlon and Ski jumping. Other sports which are possible for tourists and residents are golf, mountainbiking, shooting, hiking, fly fishing and skiing.

== History ==
The name "Ruhpolding" originates from the Bavarian word Rupoltingin and means "the people of the strong famous one". The town is mentioned as Ruhpoldingen for the first time in 1193.

It was connected to the railway in 1895. Since 1948, Ruhpolding has been a famous spa and tourist resort, especially for winter sports. The accommodation figures were 600,000 overnight stays per year in the mid-1950s, which increased to 1,122,732 overnight stays per year in 1991.

== Sport ==
=== Winter Sports ===
Ruhpolding has a biathlon track. It hosted the 1979, 1985, 1996 and 2012 Biathlon World Championships. It also has a ski jumping hill, Große Zirmbergschanze, where one World Cup event has taken place, in the 1992–93 season. In January 2023, the Winter Maccabiah Games were held in Ruhpolding.

=== Mountain Bikes ===
In the year 2007, the Mountainbike 24h Race World Championships took place in the Chiemgau Arena.

=== Speedway ===
Ruhpolding Speedway was a former motorcycle speedway team called MSC Ruhpolding and a venue called the Ruhpoldinger Speedway Stadion, off Zeller Straße, held important events. These included a qualifying round of the 1970 Speedway World Team Cup and a qualifying round of the Speedway World Championship in 1969 and 1983.

== People ==
- Ferdinand Max Bredt, German Orientalist painter
- Andreas Wellinger, Olympic champion in ski jumping
- Georg von Hertling, the German Chancellor from 1917 to 1918, died here
- Vanessa Hinz, German biathlete
- Wolfgang Pichler, biathlon coach
- Ilse Braun, sister of Eva and Gretl Braun.

== Mayors ==
- ?–1893: Anton Pointner
- 1893–1906: Mathias Huber (BBB)
- 1906–1919: Georg Eisenberger (BBB)
- 1919–1933: Bartholomäus Schmucker
- 1933 until the end of war: Anton Kreidl, Josef Wallner, Karl Huber
- 1945 and 1946: Alois Rappl, Valentin Plenk, Fritz Grübl
- 1946–1966: Josef Mayer (CSU)
- 1966–1970: Leonhard Schmucker (CSU)
- 1970–1972: Anton Stengel (UW)
- 1972–1978: Franz Schneider (SPD)
- 1978–1996: Herbert Ohl (CSU)
- 1996–2002: Gerhard Hallweger (SPD)
- 2002–2008: Andreas Hallweger (CSU)
- 2008–2020: Claus Pichler (SPD)
- since 2020: Justus Pfeifer (CSU)
