= 1933 Maccabiah Games =

International winter sports event

1st Winter Maccabiah
- Host city: Zakopane, Poland
- Nations: 8
- Athletes: 250
- Opening: February 2, 1933
- Closing: February 5, 1933
- Main venue: Wielka Krokiew, Zakopane

Summer

Winter

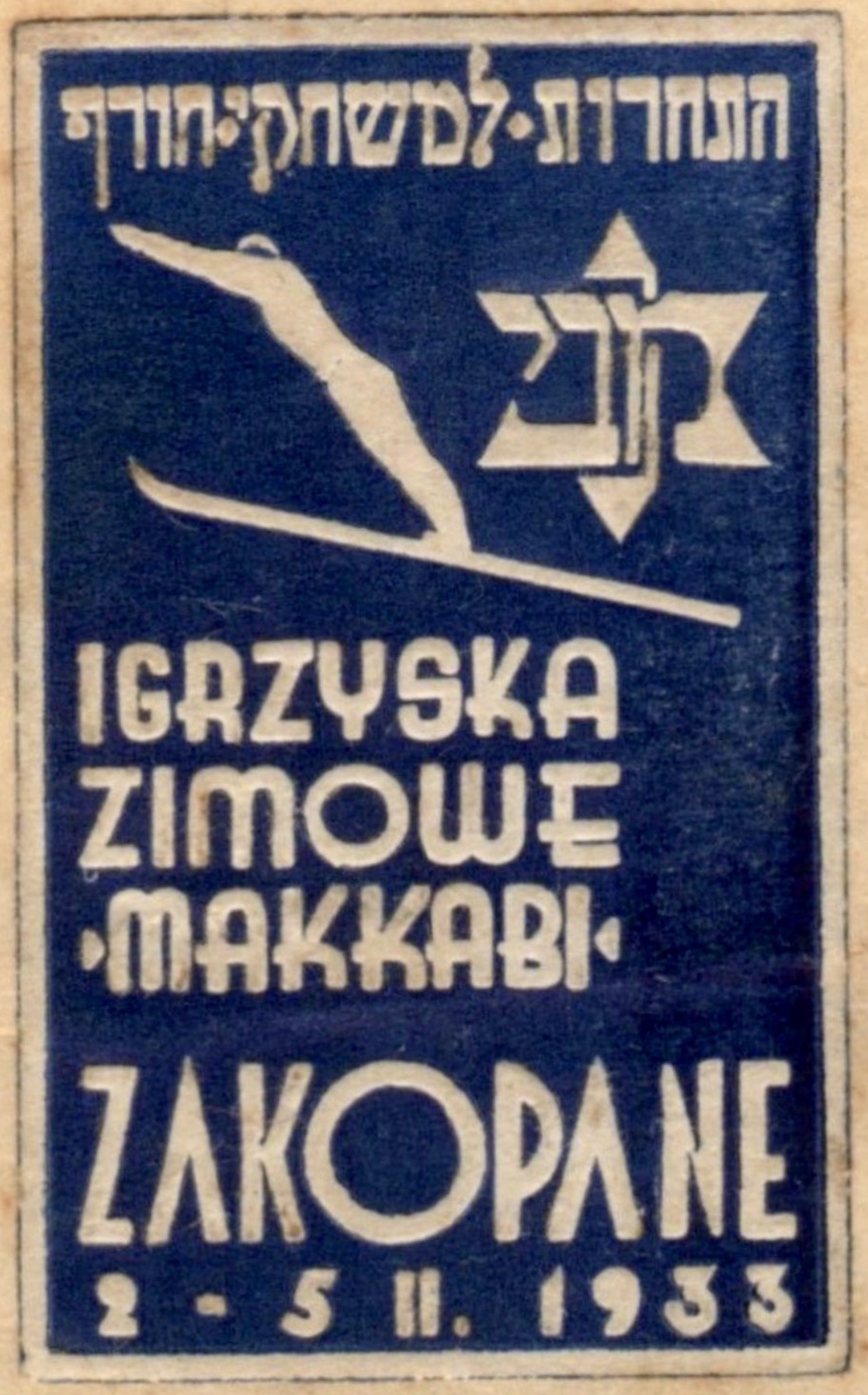
Publicity label for 1933 Zakopane Winter Maccabiah Games

The 1st Winter Maccabiah (Hebrew: מכביית החורף הראשונה; Polish: Pierwsza zimowa Makabiada) was held in Zakopane, Poland from February 2 to 5, 1933. Coincidentally, the opening ceremony took place two days after Adolf Hitler was appointed chancellor (January 30, 1933).

== History ==
Following the successful games of the 1st Maccabiah in 1932, there was a growing interest in winter sports among the European nations. The Maccabi federation of Poland was in charge of organizing the Winter Maccabiah. In the 1930s, that federation was strongest pillar of the Maccabi World Union, consisting of 30,000 Jewish athletes members. The games were met with great opposition; the Gazeta Warszawska newspaper encouraged Polish youth to intervene during the games to prevent the "Jewification of Polish winter sports venues".

== Opening ceremony ==
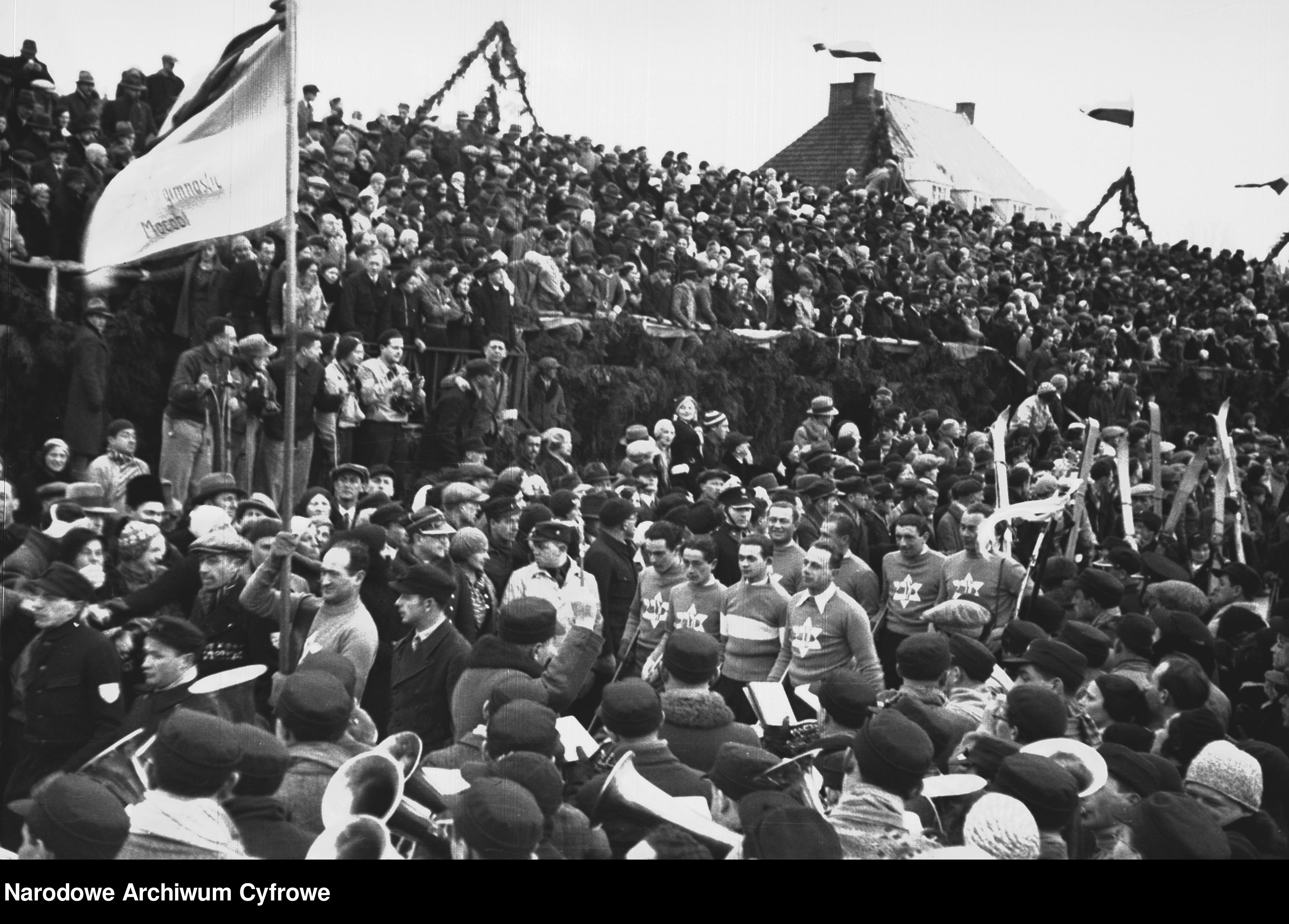
Opening Ceremony of the 1st Winter Maccabiah in Zakopane

The opening ceremony for the games took place at the Stadium in Zakopane on February 2, 1933. Lord Melchett, honorary president of the World Maccabi Organization, did not attend the ceremony; instead he sent his blessing and an apology - a large statue depicting the persecution of Jews resistance to antisemitism through the ages.

== Participating communities ==
Jewish athletes from 8 nations participated; most notably, no athletes from Eretz Yisrael took part in the games. The number in parentheses indicates the number of athletes in the delegation.

- Austria
- Czechoslovakia
- Danzig
- Germany
- Italy
- Poland (150)
- Norway
- Yugoslavia

== Games highlights ==
Poland received the most medals in the first winter Maccabiah; Some of the wins include I. Wahrenhaupt (Men's 18 km cross-country skiing), Szwarcbard (Women's 8 km cross-country skiing), M. Enker (Male Luge), R. Enker (Women Luge), G. Bergler (figure skating), H. Mückenbrun (Downhill), and Women's 3×5 kilometer relay.

The 1st Winter Maccabiah also hosted the first international Maccabiah hockey tournament.

== Table ==
Nation	Points
Poland	131
Czechoslovakia	32
Austria	29
Romania	8
