= Eva Braun =

Wife of Adolf Hitler (1912–1945)

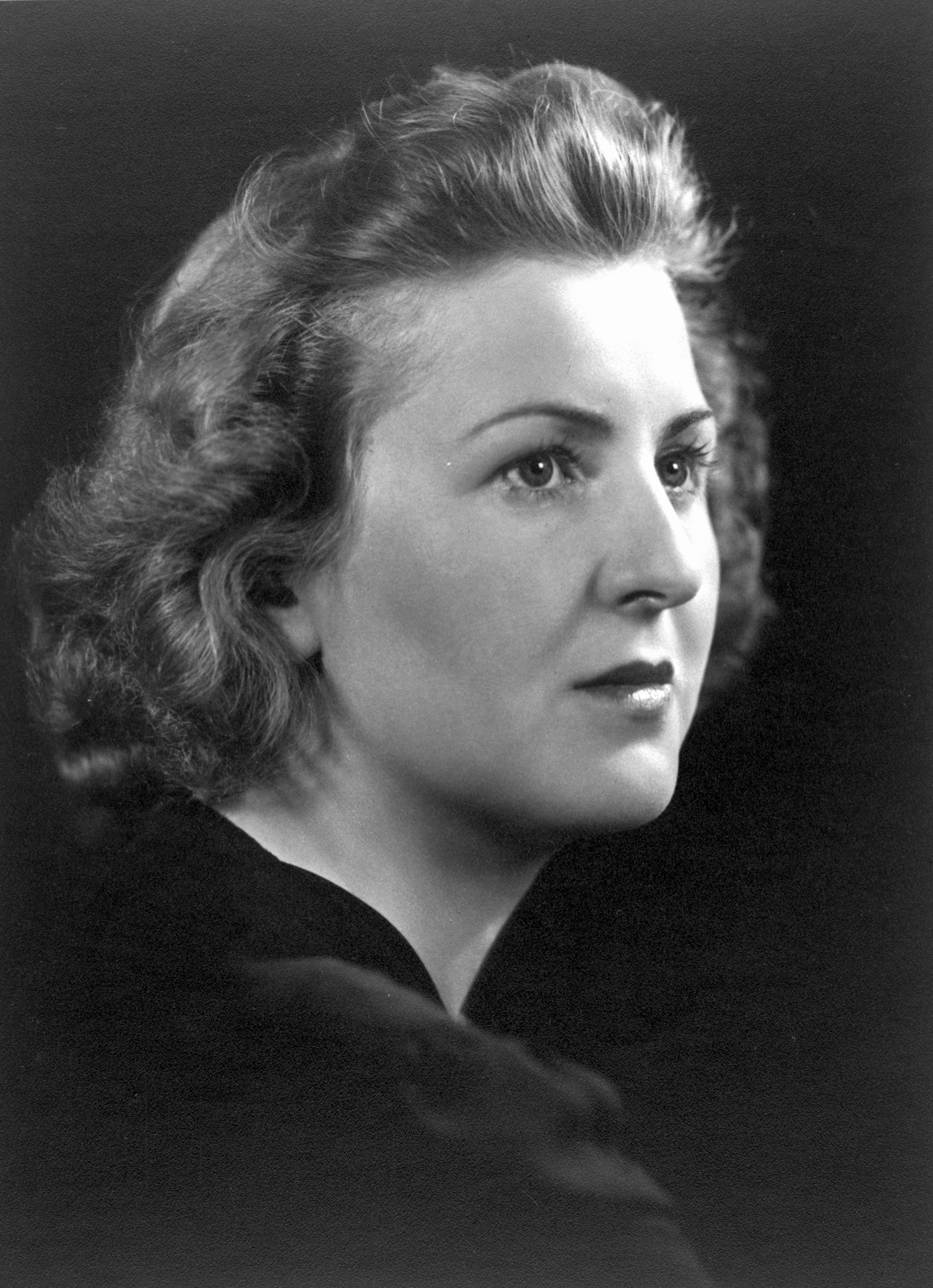
- Braun, c. the late 1930s

Spouse of the Führer of Germany
- In role 29 April 1945 – 30 April 1945
- Chancellor: Adolf Hitler
- Preceded by: Louise Ebert
- Succeeded by: Ingeborg Dönitz

Personal details
- Born: Eva Anna Paula Braun; 6 February 1912 Munich, Kingdom of Bavaria, German Empire
- Died: 30 April 1945 (aged 33) Berlin, Germany
- Cause of death: Suicide by cyanide poisoning
- Spouse: Adolf Hitler (m. 1945; died 1945)
- Relations: Ilse Braun (sister); Gretl Braun (sister)
- Occupation: Photographer; model; office assistant

Eva Anna Paula Hitler (née Braun; 6 February 1912 – 30 April 1945) was a German photographer who was Adolf Hitler's longtime companion, and, briefly, his wife — they had been married for just under two days before they both committed suicide. Braun, then age 17, met Hitler, who was 40, in Munich in 1929. She was an assistant and model for Hitler's personal photographer, Heinrich Hoffmann. Braun began seeing Hitler often about two years later.

She attempted suicide twice during their early relationship. By 1936, Braun was a part of Hitler's household at the Berghof near Berchtesgaden, Bavaria, Germany, and lived a sheltered life throughout World War II. She became a significant figure within Hitler's inner social circle, but did not attend public events with him until mid-1944, when her sister Gretl married Hermann Fegelein, the SS liaison officer on his staff.

As Nazi Germany was collapsing towards the end of the war, Braun swore loyalty to Hitler and went to Berlin to be by his side in the heavily reinforced Führerbunker beneath the Reich Chancellery garden. As Red Army troops fought their way into the centre government district, on 29 April 1945, Braun married Hitler during a brief civil ceremony; she was 33 and he was 56. Less than 40 hours later, they died by suicide in a sitting room of the bunker: Braun by biting and swallowing a capsule of cyanide, and Hitler by a gunshot to the head. (Note: The Soviets found some dental remains which did not entirely match Braun's records, including a bridge designed for her but never fitted. No other remains of Braun were confirmed.) Much of the German public was unaware of Braun's relationship with Hitler until after their deaths. She created many of the surviving colour photographs and films of Hitler.

== Early life ==
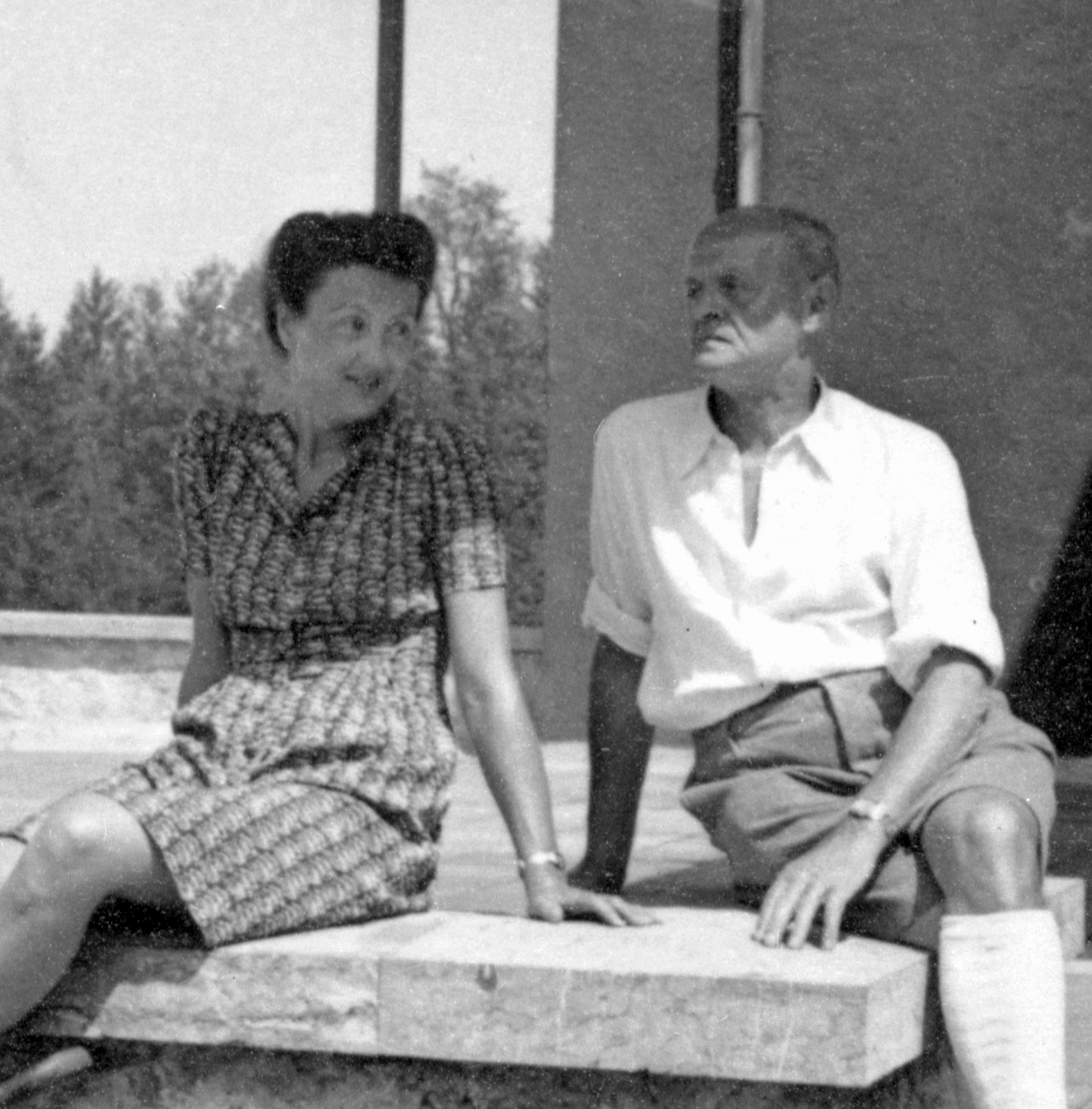
Eva's parents, Franziska Kronberger and Friderich Braun, in the 1930s

Eva Braun was born in Munich and was the second daughter of school teacher Friedrich "Fritz" Braun (1879–1964) and Franziska "Fanny" Kronberger (1885–1976); her mother had worked as a seamstress before her marriage. She had an elder sister, Ilse (1909–1979), and a younger sister, Margarete (Gretl) (1915–1987). Her father was a Lutheran and her mother a Catholic.

Braun's parents divorced in April 1921 but remarried in November 1922, probably for financial reasons; hyperinflation was plaguing the German economy at the time. Braun was educated at a Catholic lyceum in Munich, and then for one year at a business school in the Convent of the English Sisters in Simbach am Inn, where she had average grades and a talent for athletics.

At age 17, Braun took a job working for Heinrich Hoffmann, the official photographer for the Nazi Party. Initially employed as a shop assistant and sales clerk, she soon learned how to use a camera and develop photographs. Braun's younger sister, Gretl, started working at the studio in April 1932. Around the mid-1930s, Braun began dyeing her hair to achieve a particular shade of blonde.

== Relationship with Hitler ==
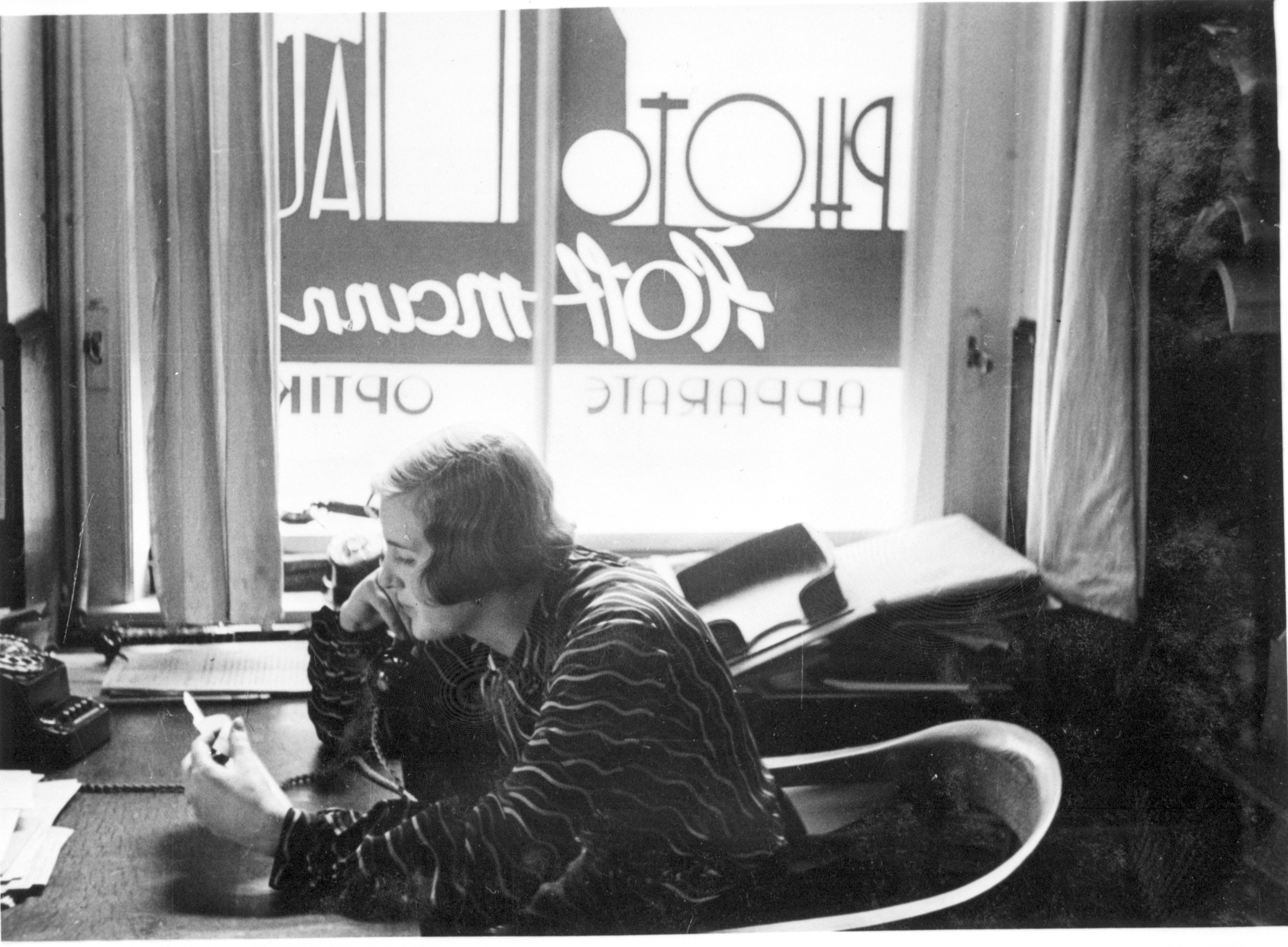
Braun at Hoffmann's studio, where she worked as a clerk, 1932

In the autumn of 1929, Hoffmann introduced Braun to Adolf Hitler (as "Herr Wolff") at Hoffmann's studio in Munich. Hitler was then 40 years old, 23 years Braun's senior.

Hitler lived with his half-niece, Geli Raubal, in an apartment at Prinzregentenplatz 16 in Munich from 1929 until her death. On 18 September 1931, Raubal was found dead in the apartment with a gunshot wound to the chest, an apparent suicide with Hitler's pistol. Hitler was in Nuremberg at the time. His relationship with Raubal—likely the most intense of his life—had been important to him. Hitler began seeing more of Braun after Raubal's suicide.

Braun herself attempted suicide on 10 or 11 August 1932 by shooting herself in the chest with her father's pistol. Historians feel the attempt was not serious, but was a bid for Hitler's attention. After Braun's recovery, Hitler became more committed to her and by the end of 1932, they had become lovers. She often stayed overnight at his Munich apartment when he was in town. She also went on trips with Hitler to Obersalzberg, sometimes accompanied by her sister Gretl.

Beginning in 1933, Braun worked as a photographer for Hoffmann. This position enabled her to travel—accompanied by Hoffmann—with Hitler's entourage as a photographer for the Nazi Party. Braun also worked for Hoffmann's art press, known for making postcards for the Great German Art Exhibition.

According to a fragment of her diary and the account of biographer Nerin Gun, Braun's second suicide attempt occurred in May 1935. She took an overdose of sleeping pills when Hitler failed to make time for her in his life. Hitler provided Braun and her sister with a three-bedroom flat in Munich that August, and the next year the sisters were provided with a villa in Bogenhausen at Wasserburgerstr. 12 (now Delpstr. 12). By 1936, Braun was at Hitler's household at the Berghof near Berchtesgaden when he was in residence there, but she lived mostly in Munich. Braun had her own flat at the new Reich Chancellery in Berlin, designed by Albert Speer, as well as a beach house near Pobierowo (now in Poland), where she occasionally took holidays.

Braun was a member of Hoffmann's staff when she attended the Nuremberg Rally for the first time in 1935. Hitler's half-sister, Angela Raubal (Geli's mother), took exception to her presence there and was later dismissed from her position as housekeeper at the Berghof. Researchers are unable to ascertain if her dislike for Braun was the only reason for her departure, but other members of Hitler's entourage saw Braun as untouchable from then on.

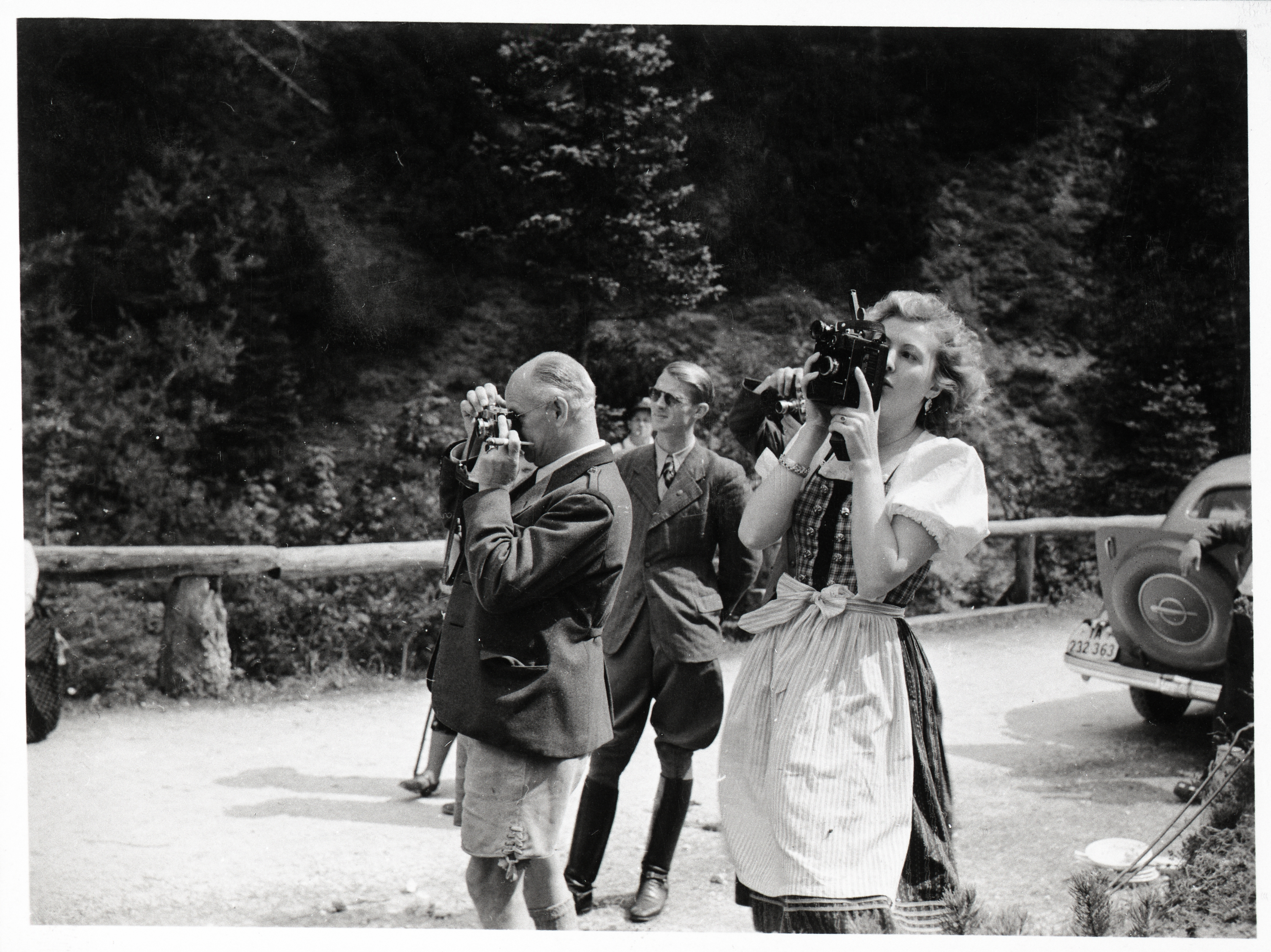
Braun filming around 1940

Hitler wished to present himself in the image of a chaste hero; in the Nazi ideology, men were the political leaders and warriors, and women were homemakers. Hitler believed that he was sexually attractive to women and wished to exploit this for political gain by remaining single, as he felt marriage would decrease his appeal. He and Braun never appeared as a couple in public; the only time they appeared together in a published news photo was when she sat near him at the 1936 Winter Olympics. Many German people were unaware of Braun's relationship with Hitler until after the war. Braun had her own room adjoining Hitler's at both the Berghof and the Führerbunker complex beneath the Reich Chancellery garden in Berlin.

Biographer Heike Görtemaker wrote that women did not play a big role in the politics of Nazi Germany. Braun's political influence on Hitler was minimal; she was never allowed to stay in the room when business or political conversations took place and was sent out of the room when cabinet ministers or other dignitaries were present. She was not a member of the Nazi Party. In his post-war memoirs, Hoffmann characterised Braun's outlook as "inconsequential and feather-brained"; her main interests were sports, clothes, and the cinema. She led a sheltered and privileged existence and seemed uninterested in politics. One instance when she took an interest was in 1943, shortly after Germany had fully transitioned to a total war economy; among other things, this meant a potential ban on women's cosmetics and luxuries. According to Speer's memoirs, Braun approached Hitler in "high indignation"; Hitler quietly instructed Speer, who was armaments minister at the time, to halt production of women's cosmetics and luxuries rather than instituting an outright ban. Speer later said, "Eva Braun will prove a great disappointment to historians."

Braun continued to work for Hoffmann after starting her relationship with Hitler. She took many photographs and films of members of Hitler's inner circle, some of which were sold to Hoffmann for high prices; she received money from Hoffmann's company as late as 1943. Braun also held the position of private secretary to Hitler. This meant she could enter and leave the Chancellery unremarked, through a side entrance and a rear staircase. Görtemaker notes that Braun and Hitler enjoyed a normal sex life. Braun's friends and relatives described Eva giggling over a 1938 photograph of Neville Chamberlain sitting on a sofa in Hitler's Munich flat with the remark: "If only he knew what goings-on that sofa has seen."

On 3 June 1944, Braun's sister Gretl married SS-Gruppenführer Hermann Fegelein, who served as Reichsführer-SS Heinrich Himmler's liaison officer on Hitler's staff. Hitler used the marriage as an excuse to allow Braun to appear at official functions, as she could then be introduced as Fegelein's sister-in-law. When Fegelein was caught in the closing days of the war trying to escape to Sweden or Switzerland, Hitler ordered his execution. He was shot for desertion in the Reich Chancellery garden on 28 April 1945.

== Lifestyle ==
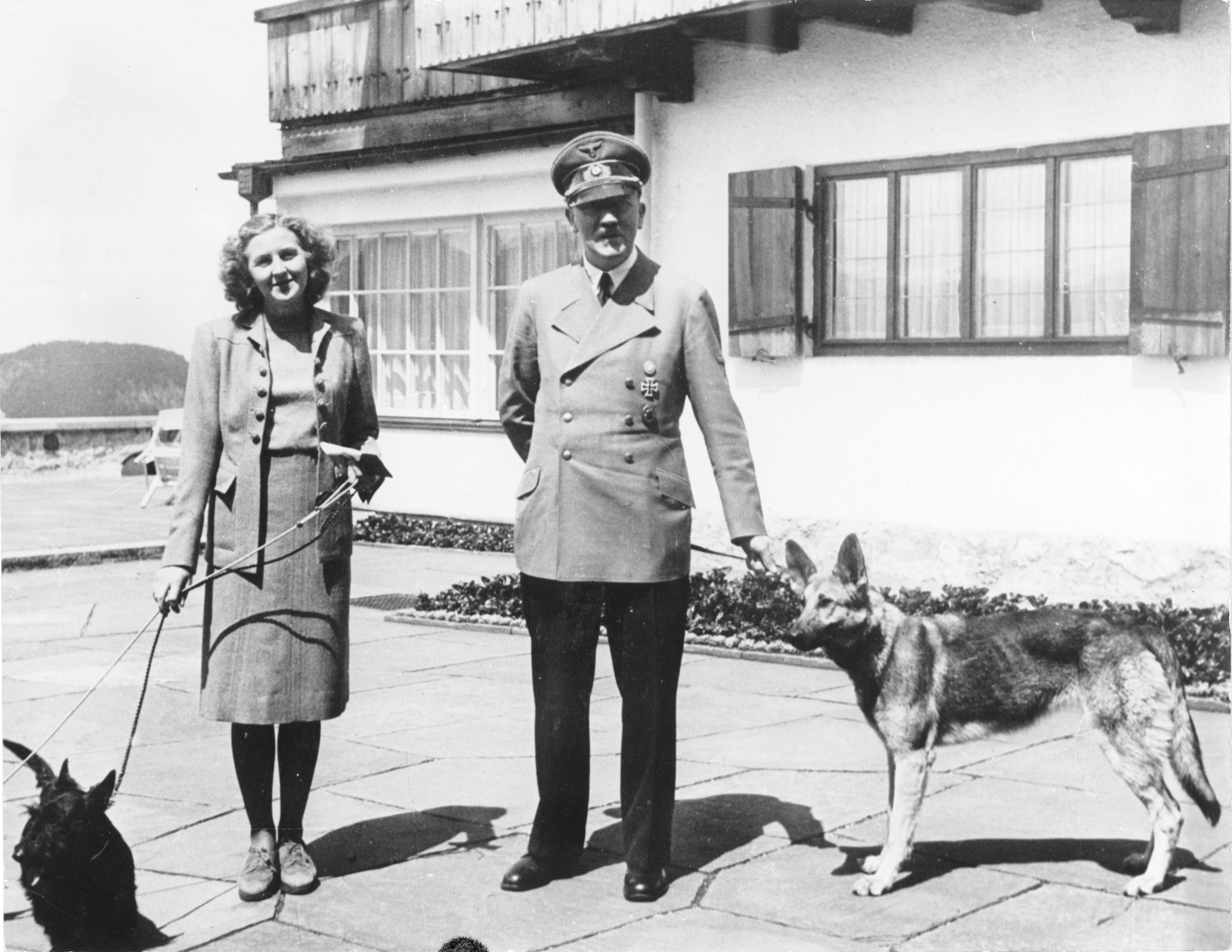
Braun and Hitler with two of their dogs, 1942

When Hitler purchased the Berghof in 1933, it was a small holiday home on the mountain at Obersalzberg. Renovations began in 1934 and were completed by 1936. A large wing was added onto the original house and several additional buildings were constructed. The entire area was fenced off, and remaining houses on the mountain were purchased by the Nazi Party and demolished. Braun and the other members of the entourage were cut off from the outside world when in residence. Speer, Hermann Göring, and Martin Bormann had houses constructed inside the compound.

Hitler's valet, Heinz Linge, stated in his memoirs that Hitler and Braun had two bedrooms and two bathrooms with interconnecting doors at the Berghof, and Hitler would end most evenings alone with her in his study before they retired to bed. She would wear a "dressing gown or house-coat" and drink wine; Hitler would have tea. Public displays of affection or physical contact were nonexistent, even in the enclosed world of the Berghof. Braun took the role of hostess amongst the regular visitors, though she was not involved in running the household. She regularly invited friends and family members to accompany her during her stays, the only guest to do so.

When Henriette von Schirach suggested that Braun should go into hiding after the war, Braun replied, "Do you think I would let him die alone? I will stay with him up until the last moment". Hitler named Braun in his will, to receive 12,000 Reichsmarks yearly after his death. He was very fond of her, and worried when she participated in sports or was late returning for tea.

Braun was very fond of Negus and Stasi, her two Scottish Terrier dogs, and they appear in her home movies. She usually kept them away from Hitler's German Shepherd, Blondi. Blondi was killed by one of Hitler's entourage on 29 April 1945 when he ordered that one of the cyanide capsules obtained for Braun and Hitler's suicide the next day be tested on the dog. Braun's dogs and Blondi's puppies were shot on 30 April by Hitler's dog handler, Fritz Tornow.

== Braun's films ==
As a filmmaker and photographer, Braun documented her surroundings between 1938 and 1944. The resulting footage — now categorized by the U.S. National Archives (NARA) as "Private Motion Pictures of Adolf Hitler and Eva Braun" — captures her personal life as well as leisure and work activities of Hitler's inner circle. The collection includes nine surviving reels of 16mm silent color and black and white film, compiled from the original 28. Some of the footage has been used in historical documentaries and exhibitions. The earliest documented uses are in US newsreels from 1947.

== Marriage and suicide ==
In early April 1945, Braun travelled from Munich to Berlin to be with Hitler at the Führerbunker. She refused to leave as the Red Army closed in on the capital. After midnight on the night of 28–29 April, Hitler and Braun were married in a small civil ceremony in the bunker. The event was witnessed by Joseph Goebbels and Martin Bormann. Hitler then hosted a modest wedding breakfast with his new wife. When Braun married Hitler, her legal name changed to Eva Hitler. When she signed her marriage certificate, she wrote the letter B for her family name, then crossed this out and replaced it with Hitler.

After 1 pm on 30 April 1945, Braun and Hitler said their farewells to staff and members of the inner circle. Later that afternoon, at approximately 3:30 pm, several people reported hearing a gunshot. After waiting a few minutes, Linge, accompanied by Hitler's SS adjutant, Otto Günsche, entered the small study and found the lifeless bodies of Hitler and Braun on a small sofa. Braun had bitten into a cyanide capsule and Hitler had shot himself in the right temple with his pistol. The corpses were carried up the stairs and through the bunker's emergency exit to the garden behind the Reich Chancellery, where they were burned during the Red Army shelling of the area. Braun was 33 years old when she died; Hitler was 56.

By 11 May 1945, two colleagues of Hitler's dentist, Hugo Blaschke—his assistant Käthe Heusermann and dental technician Fritz Echtmann—identified dental remains as Hitler and Braun's, including a metallic dental bridge and gold filling belonging to Braun. (Note: The remains of several people (including Joseph and Magda Goebbels, the six Goebbels children, General Hans Krebs, and Hitler's dogs) were repeatedly buried and exhumed by the Soviets, ending up in Magdeburg, East Germany, before their cremation in 1970. Hitler and Braun's remains were also allegedly examined, moved and cremated, but this is most likely Soviet disinformation alongside Joseph Stalin's narrative that the couple may have escaped.) There is no evidence that any other bodily remains of the couple were found by the Soviets. (Note: Several witnesses, some historians and authors argue that Hitler and Braun's bodies were burnt nearly to ashes or at least unrecognizable corpses, with the heavy bombardment of the area also having an effect. However, several studies have found that extreme burning does not typically disintegrate bones, with German forensic biologist Mark Benecke arguing that body water would hinder an open-air cremation.) According to Blaschke, Braun was never fitted with a bridge. He also stated that Braun's left maxillar premolars had dental work, omitted by an alleged Soviet autopsy. The largely disregarded Soviet report counts only 11 teeth, as opposed to Blaschke's statement that she had 26 remaining. In 1974, forensic odontologist Reidar F. Sognnaes noted that the Soviets recorded otherwise undocumented dental caries in the alleged corpse. Heusermann confirmed that a bridge made for Braun was never actually fitted, saying the Soviets found it in the Chancellery dental office. (Note: In the case of Hitler's alleged autopsy, discussion of the dental remains was added at a later date.) (Note: The purported autopsy claimed that the photographed bridge, allegedly mandibular, was found loose under the corpse's tongue.) Sognnaes noted that the non-metallic part of the prosthesis would have been destroyed by fire, as opposed to porcelain affixed to two of Braun's teeth which should have survived.

In December 1945, Hitler's pilot Hans Baur claimed during his Soviet captivity that in her last days Braun was pregnant with Hitler's child.

The rest of Braun's family survived the war. Her mother, Franziska, died aged 91 in January 1976, having lived out her days in an old farmhouse in Ruhpolding, Bavaria. Her father, Fritz, died in 1964. Gretl gave birth to a daughter—whom she named Eva—on 5 May 1945. She later married Kurt Beringhoff, a businessman, and died in 1987. Braun's elder sister, Ilse, was not part of Hitler's inner circle. She married twice and died in 1979.

== Bibliography ==
- Beevor, Antony (2002). Berlin: The Downfall 1945. Viking Press. ISBN 978-0-670-03041-5.
- Bezymenski, Lev (1968). The Death of Adolf Hitler (1st ed.). New York: Harcourt, Brace & World.
- Bullock, Alan (1999) [1952]. Hitler: A Study in Tyranny. New York: Konecky & Konecky. ISBN 978-1-56852-036-0.
- Connolly, Kate (14 February 2010). "Nazi loyalist and Adolf Hitler's devoted aide: the true story of Eva Braun". The Observer. Guardian News and Media.
- "Dental Records: Evidence on Eva Braun doubted". The Canberra Times. Australian Associated Press. 12 November 1981. p. 5.
- Eberle, Henrik; Uhl, Matthias, eds. (2005). The Hitler Book: The Secret Dossier Prepared for Stalin from the Interrogations of Hitler's Personal Aides. New York: Public Affairs. ISBN 978-1-58648-366-1.
- Fest, Joachim (2004). Inside Hitler's Bunker: The Last Days of the Third Reich. Translated by Searls, Damion. New York: Farrar, Straus and Giroux. ISBN 978-0-374-13577-5.
- Görtemaker, Heike B. (2011). Eva Braun: Life with Hitler. New York: Alfred A. Knopf. ISBN 978-0-307-59582-9.
- Guerin, Frances (2012). "At Home, at Play, on Vocation with Eva Braun: From the Berghof to YouTube and the Imperative to Remember". Through Amateur Eyes: Film and Photography in Nazi Germany. Minneapolis: University of Minnesota Press. pp. 217–286. doi:10.5749/minnesota/9780816670062.003.0005. ISBN 978-1-4529-4700-6.
- Guest, Katy (12 March 2006). "The Eva Braun story: Behind every evil man ..." The Independent. London: INM. ISSN 0951-9467. OCLC 185201487.
- Hoffmann, Heinrich (1955). Hitler was My Friend. London: Burke. OCLC 1486685.
- Joachimsthaler, Anton (1999) [1995]. The Last Days of Hitler: The Legends, The Evidence, The Truth. London: Brockhampton Press. ISBN 978-1-86019-902-8.
- Junge, Traudl (2003). Until the Final Hour: Hitler's Last Secretary. London: Weidenfeld & Nicolson. ISBN 978-0-297-84720-5.
- Kershaw, Ian (2000). Hitler, 1936–1945: Nemesis. New York; London: W. W. Norton & Company. ISBN 978-0-393-32252-1.
- Kershaw, Ian (2008). Hitler: A Biography. New York: W. W. Norton & Company. ISBN 978-0-393-06757-6.
- Knopp, Guido (2003). Hitler's Women. New York: Routledge. ISBN 978-0-415-94730-5.
- Lambert, Angela (2006). The Lost Life of Eva Braun. New York: St. Martin's Press. ISBN 978-0-312-36654-4.
- Linge, Heinz (2009). With Hitler to the End: The Memoir of Hitler's Valet. New York: Frontline–Skyhorse. ISBN 978-1-84832-544-9.
- McNab, Chris (2014). Hitler's Fortresses: German Fortifications and Defences 1939–45. Oxford; New York: Osprey Publishing. ISBN 978-1-78200-828-6.
- Musmanno, Michael A. (1950). Ten Days to Die. Garden City, NY: Doubleday.
- Reck-Malleczewen, Friedrich (2000) [1947]. Diary of a Man in Despair. London: Duckworth Literary Entertainments. ISBN 978-0-7156-3000-6.
- Speer, Albert (1971) [1969]. Inside the Third Reich. New York: Avon. ISBN 978-0-380-00071-5.
- Vinogradov, V. K. (2005). Hitler's Death: Russia's Last Great Secret from the Files of the KGB. Chaucer Press. ISBN 978-1-904449-13-3.
