= Ilse Braun =

Sister of Eva Braun (1909–1979)

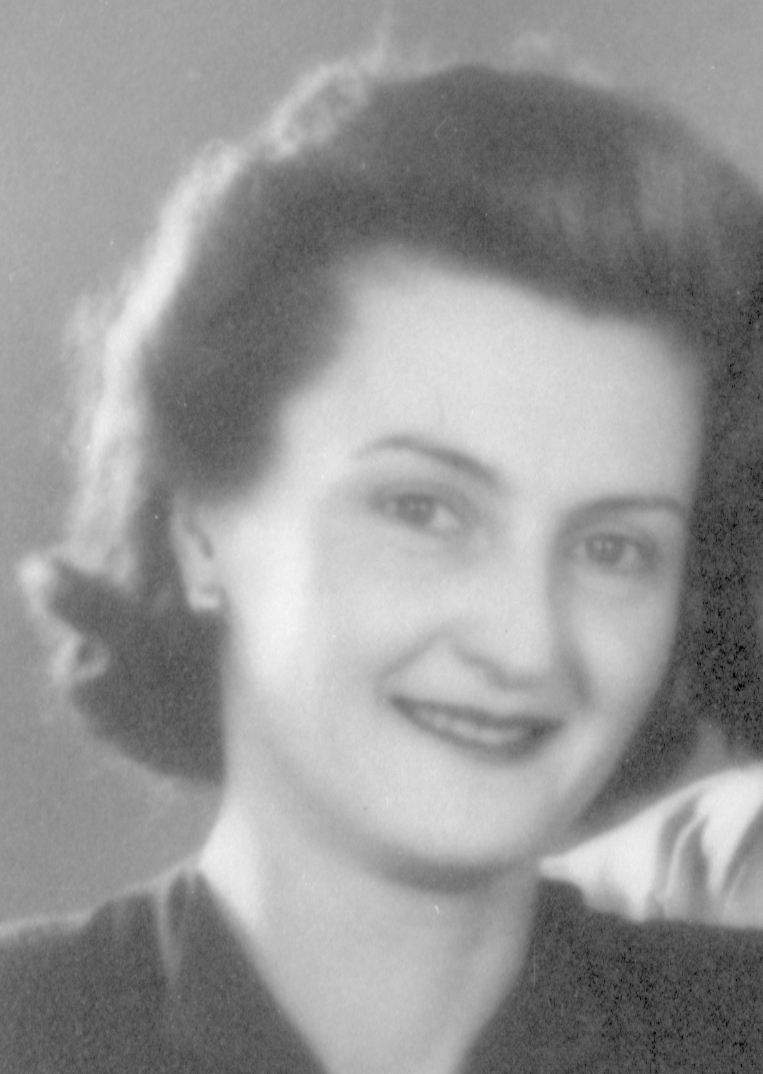
- Born: Ilse Ruth Braun; 18 June 1909; Munich, Bavaria, German Empire
- Died: 28 June 1979 (aged 70); Munich, Bavaria, West Germany
- Known for: Adolf Hitler’s sister-in-law through her sister Eva Braun
- Spouse(s): Herr Höchstetter (m. 1937; div. 1940) Herr Fucke-Michels (m. 1941)
- Children: None
- Parent(s): Friedrich Braun, Franziska Kronberger
- Relatives: Eva Braun (sister); Gretl Braun (sister)

Ilse Braun (18 June 1909 – 28 June 1979) was one of two sisters of Eva Braun. Born in Munich, Ilse was the oldest daughter of school teacher Friedrich "Fritz" Braun and seamstress Franziska "Fanny" Kronberger. She became the sister-in-law of Nazi dictator Adolf Hitler following his marriage to Eva on 29 April 1945, less than 40 hours before the couple died by suicide on 30 April 1945.

== Biography ==
Braun moved out of her parents' home in 1929 and took a position as an assistant to Martin Levy Marx, a Jewish otolaryngologist and surgeon. She was provided with a room at the office of her employer, and left his employ only when he made preparations to emigrate to the United States in 1937 in the face of persecution of Jews in Nazi Germany. Non-Aryan doctors had been excluded from payments under the national health insurance plan in April 1933, and the passing of the Law for the Protection of German Blood and German Honour in 1937 meant he and Braun risked arrest on charges of "defiling the race". Marx's licence to practice medicine was revoked in 1938 and he was expatriated in April 1939. His doctorate was revoked in October 1939; he had already emigrated to the United States by then. Braun stated after the war that she and Eva had tried unsuccessfully to intercede on his behalf.

Eva overdosed on sleeping pills on 28 May 1935 in a suicide attempt. (Note: It is possible that this suicide attempt never happened; see Goeschel 2009, p. 150.) Ilse discovered her that night, gave first aid, and called a doctor. Ilse removed the relevant pages from Eva's diary to protect Eva's relationship with Hitler; the diary indicated that he had failed to make adequate time for Eva. This was Eva's second suicide attempt—she had shot herself in August 1932.

Braun began working in the Berlin office of Albert Speer on 15 March 1937. Speer, an architect, had just been appointed General Building Inspector for the Reich Capital. Braun was one of his first employees. She left Speer's employ and married a man named Höchstetter in October that same year. Braun and Höchstetter divorced after three years of marriage. After graduating from a journalism programme, Braun began work as an editor at Deutsche Allgemeine Zeitung, a conservative newspaper. She remarried in 1941 to a man named Fucke-Michels, and moved to Breslau, where she was employed by the Schlesische Zeitung.

Braun had no involvement in politics. Unlike her sisters Eva and Gretl, she was not a member of Hitler's inner circle or a regular visitor to the Berghof in Bavaria, though she fled there at the end of the war. She loved to dance, and became a European amateur champion in ballroom dancing. Braun lived with her mother in the family home in Ruhpolding in Upper Bavaria after her father's death in 1964. She died of cancer in Munich in 1979, and is buried there, next to her niece, Eva Fegelein-Berlinghoff (daughter of Gretl Braun and Hermann Fegelein). She had no children. On her grave, she is identified as Ilse Fucke-Michels.
