= 2023 Maccabiah Games =

International winter sports event

3rd Winter Maccabiah
- Host city: Ruhpolding, Germany
- Nations: 20
- Athletes: 400
- Opening: 1 January 2023
- Closing: 9 January 2023

Winter

The 3rd Winter Maccabiah was an international winter sports sports event held from 1 January 2023 to 9 January 2023 in Ruhpolding, Germany. Approximately 400 athletes from 20 nations participated in the games. The 2023 Maccabiah Games were notable for being the first Jewish Winter Maccabiah Games in 87 years. German Foreign Minister Annalena Baerbock highlighted the event as a celebration of Jewish culture and identity. Josef Schuster, President of the Central Council of Jews in Germany, described the games as a significant symbol of Jewish life in Germany.

== History ==
The Winter Maccabiah served to revive a historical tradition and provided an opportunity for Jewish athletes to compete in winter sports in a significant cultural context. About 400 athletes participated in various sports, including alpine skiing, cross-country skiing, snowboarding, biathlon, figure skating, Bavarian curling, and snow volleyball. The event featured an opening ceremony on January 1, along with cultural activities such as a combination havdalah and pool party, a Kabbalat Shabbat, and a closing ceremony on January 9. Events were livestreamed on YouTube.

== Participants ==
The 2023 Winter Maccabiah was open to participants who are members of Jewish Maccabi sports clubs worldwide, regardless of religion or nationality. 20 nations participated, including:

- Australia
- Germany – host country and largest delegation
- Israel
- Ukraine
- United States – all sports but snow volleyball
