= Ferdinand Max Bredt =

German painter (1860–1921)

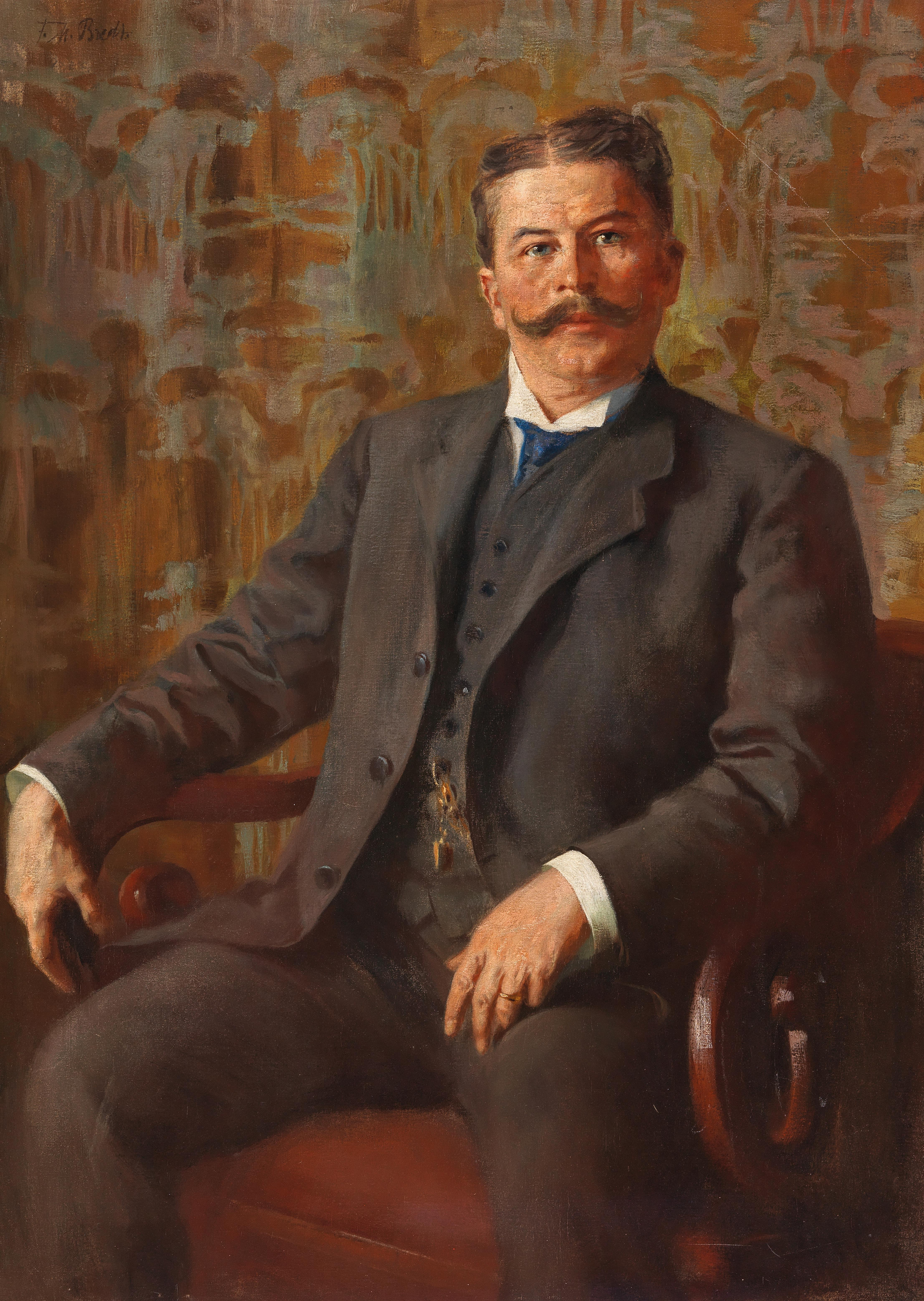
- self portrait
- Born: 1860; Leipzig, German Confederation
- Died: 1921 (aged 60–61)
- Movement: Orientalist

Ferdinand Max Bredt (1860–1921) was a German Orientalist painter, noted for his studies of female figures.

== Background ==
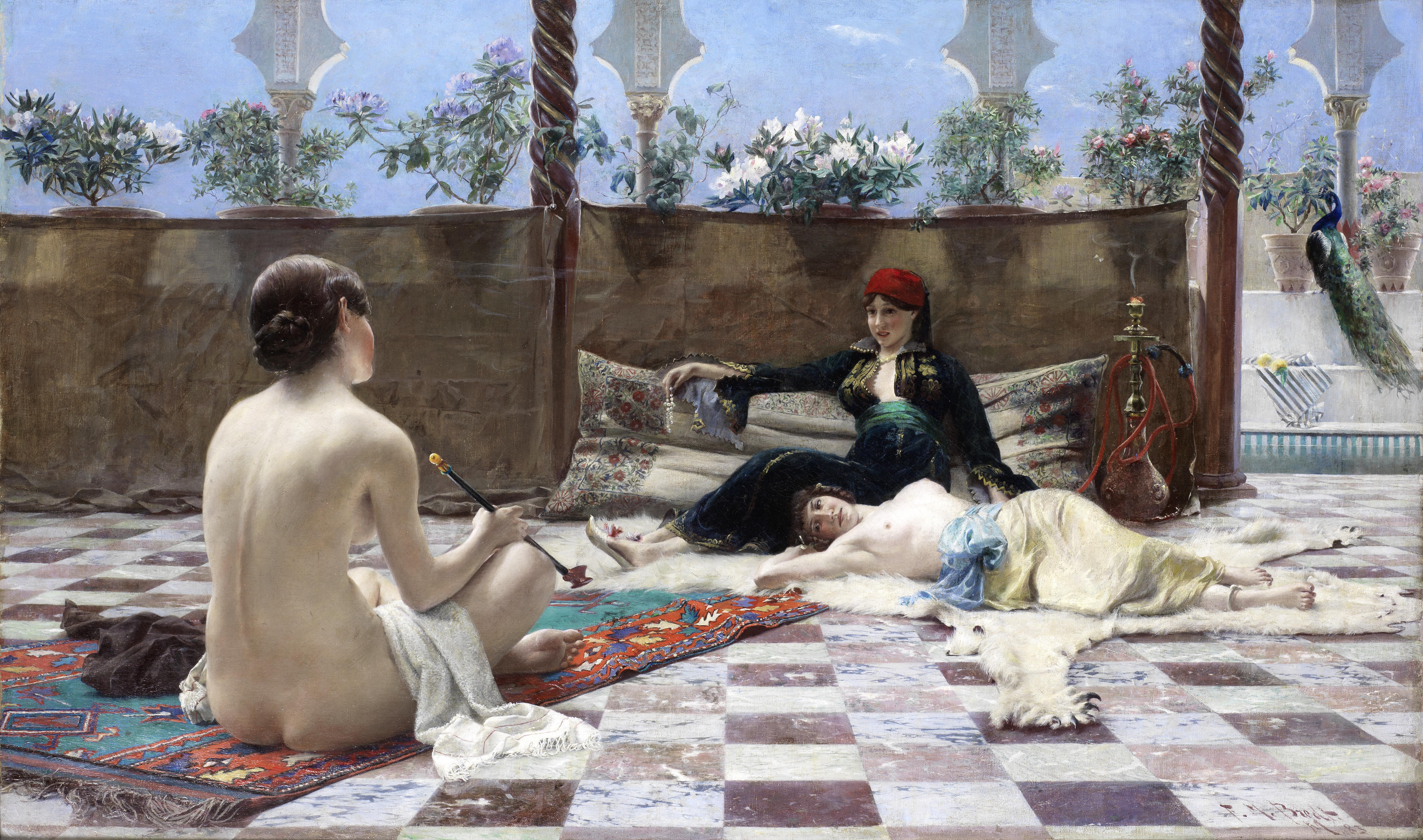
"Turkish Women"

Also known as F. M. Bredt because of that signature on his work, he is regarded as one of Germany's leading Orientalist painters. Bredt was born in Leipzig, Germany in 1860, and originally trained as a book dealer. Transitioning to art, he studied first at the School of Art in Stuttgart, Germany, before continuing his studies in Munich, under Wilhelm Lindenschmit (the Younger). Bredt travelled extensively during his life, taking voyages to Greece, Italy, Turkey and Tunisia, producing an extensive body of work in oil and watercolor.

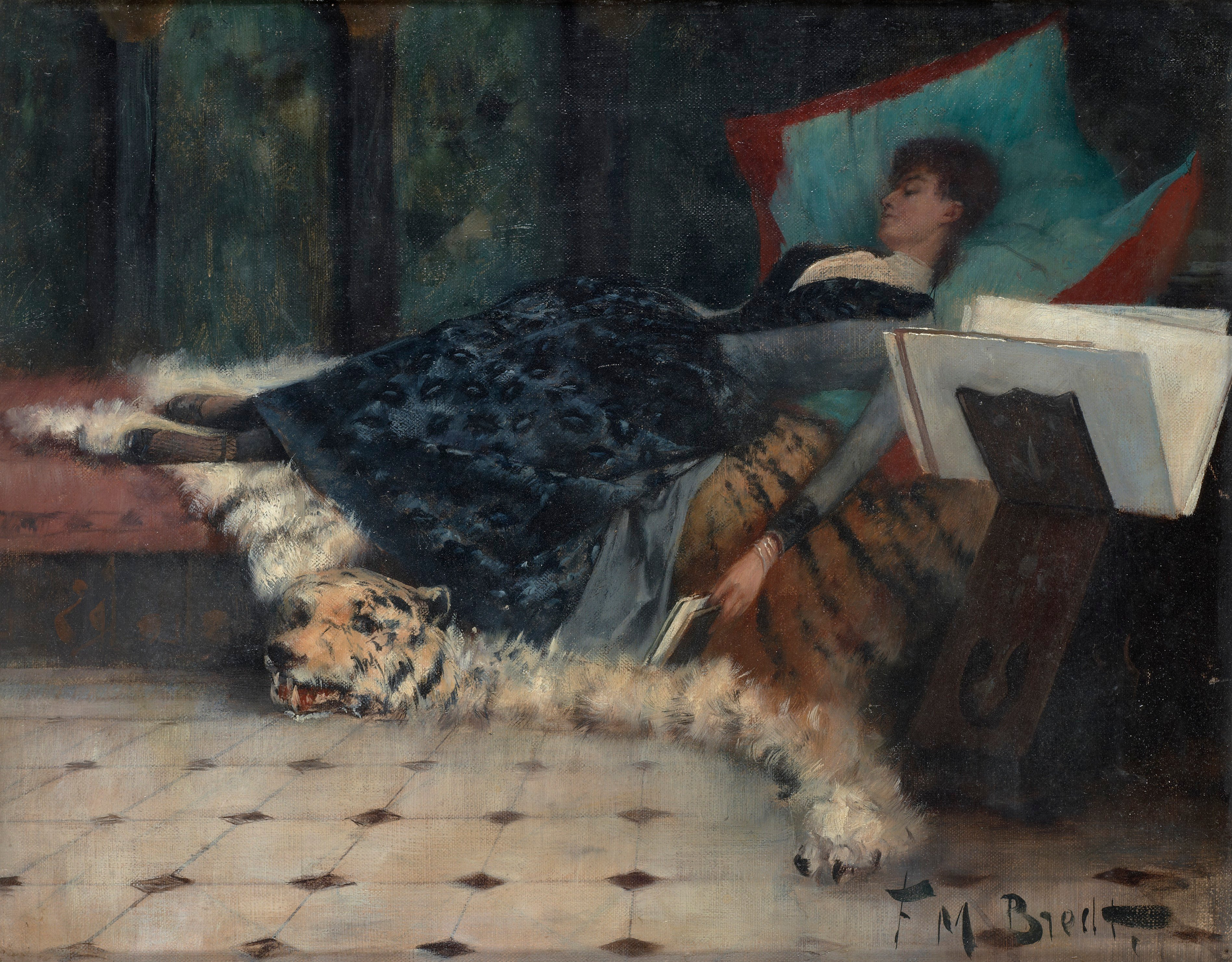

Bredt predominantly uses female subjects that he places in exotic locations, interiors, and courtyard. He was fascinated with Oriental architecture; he built his house and studio in Ruhpolding, Germany in an Arabian style.

The work of Bredt was exhibited in Paris, Berlin, Chicago and London. Today he is little-known, but he was widely recognized in his lifetime for his works. Two of his paintings were chosen to represent his native Germany at the World's Columbian Exposition of 1893.

== See also ==
- List of German painters
- List of Orientalist artists
