= Gretl Braun =

Sister-in-law of Adolf Hitler (1915–1987)

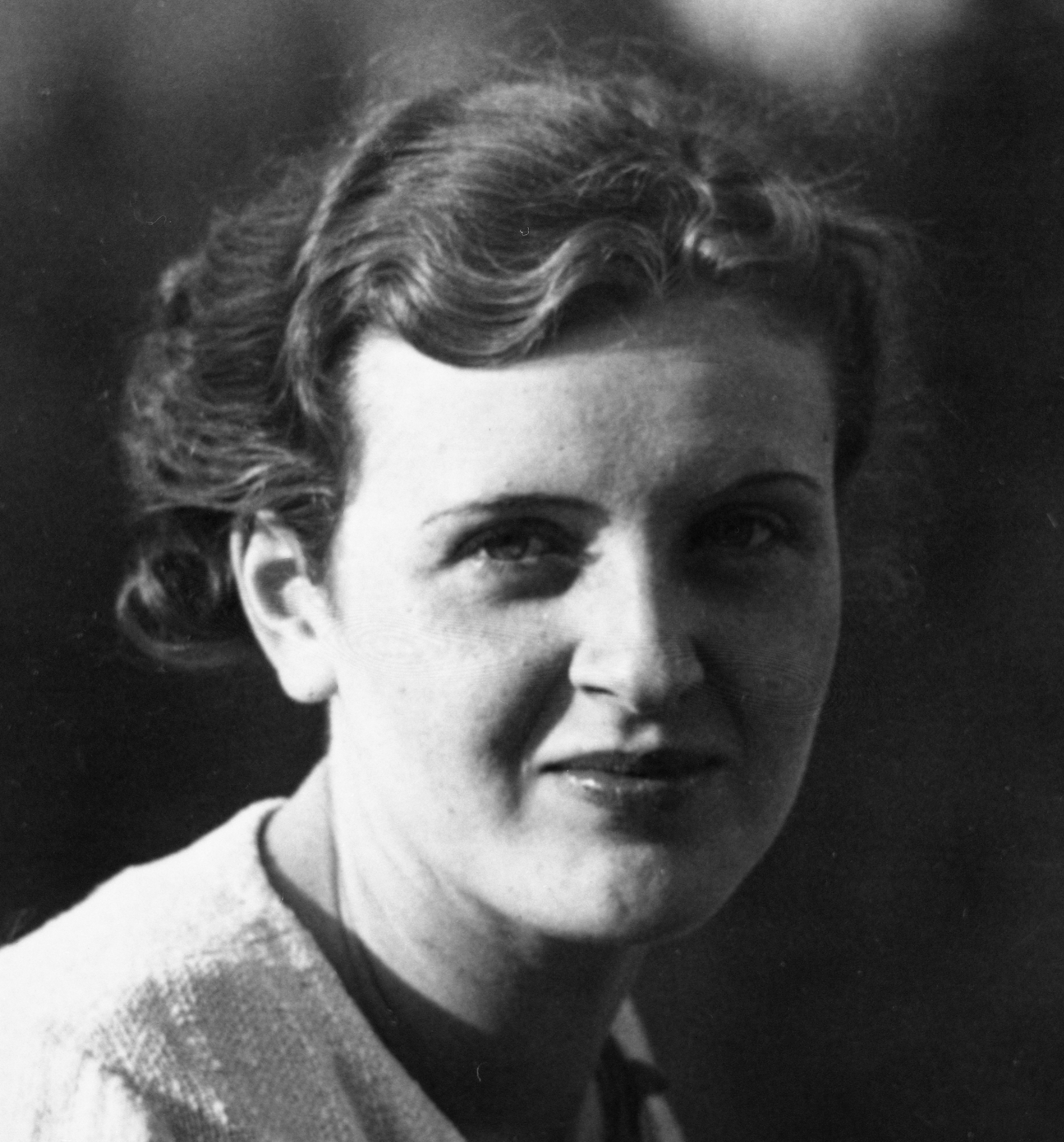
- Braun in the 1930s
- Born: Margarete Berta Braun; 31 August 1915; Munich, German Empire
- Died: 10 October 1987 (aged 72); Steingaden, West Germany
- Spouses: Hermann Fegelein (m. 1944; died 1945) Kurt Berlinghoff (m. 1954–1987) (her death)
- Children: Eva Barbara Fegelein
- Relatives: Eva Braun (sister); Ilse Braun (sister)

Margarete Berta "Gretl" Berlinghoff (née Braun; German: [ˈɡʁeːtl̩ ˈbʁaʊn]; 31 August 1915 – 10 October 1987) was one of the two sisters of Eva Braun. She was a member of the inner social circle of Adolf Hitler at the Berghof. Gretl became the sister-in-law of Hitler following his marriage to Eva, less than 40 hours before the couple killed themselves.

Braun married SS-Gruppenführer Hermann Fegelein, a liaison officer on Hitler's staff, on 3 June 1944. In the closing days of World War II, Fegelein was shot for desertion in the Reich Chancellery garden, two days before Hitler and Eva committed suicide in the Führerbunker. Despite Gretl's ties to the Nazi regime, she managed to survive the war nearly completely unscathed. She changed her name, remarried, and lived a quiet life until her death in 1987.

== Early life ==
Braun was the youngest of three daughters of school teacher Friedrich "Fritz" Braun and seamstress Franziska "Fanny" Kronberger. Starting in April 1931, she worked as a clerk for the photography company of Heinrich Hoffmann, the official photographer for the Nazi Party, who also employed her sister Eva. Gretl dropped out of secondary school at the age of 16. Hitler provided the sisters with a three-bedroom apartment in Munich in August 1935, and the next year with a villa in Bogenhausen. Their father was not pleased with this arrangement and wrote to Hitler to protest about it. The sisters were keen photographers; in 1943 Gretl left Hoffman's studio and attended the Bavarian State School of Photography.

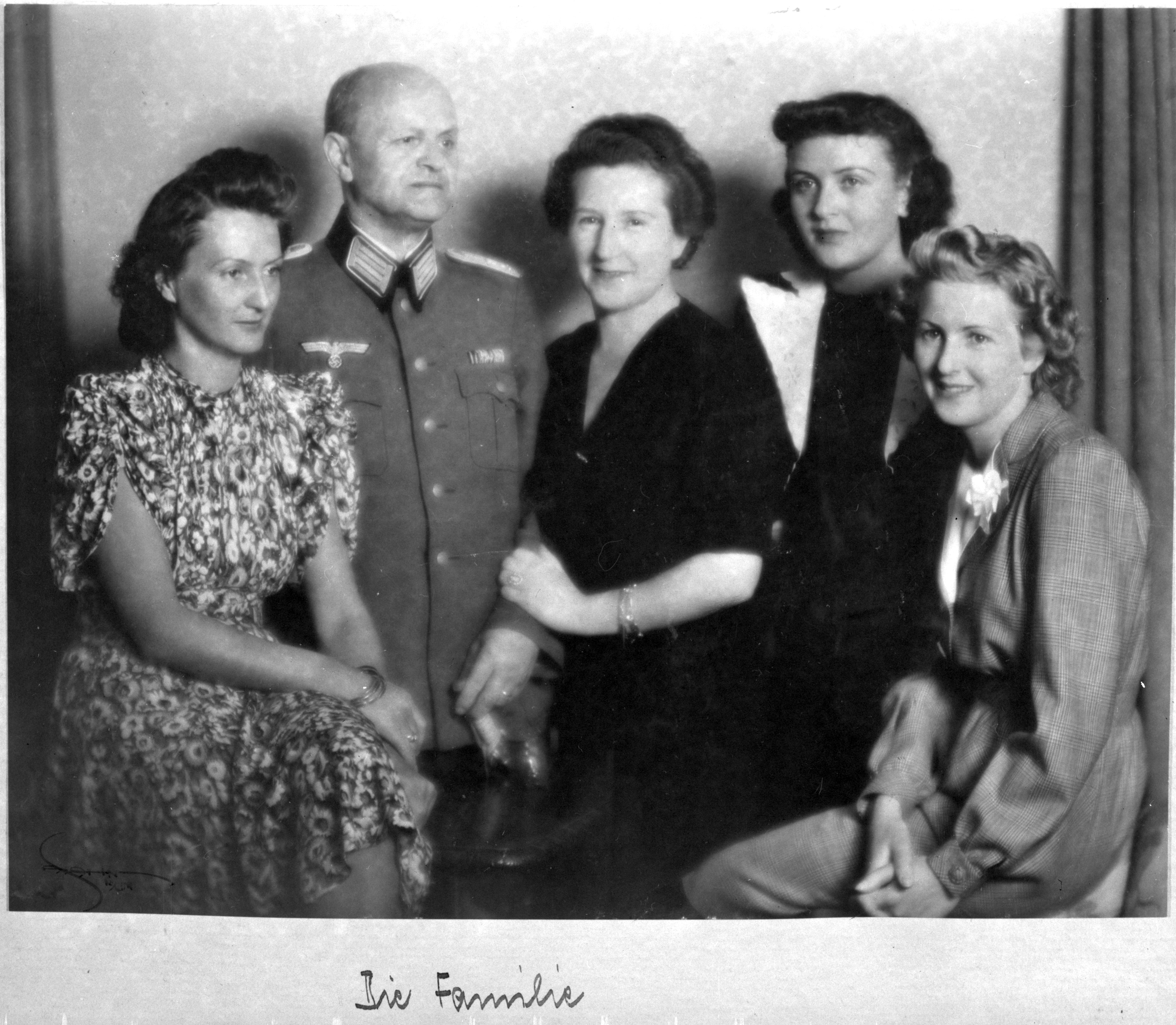
From left to right: Ilse, the girls' parents, Gretl, and Eva Braun

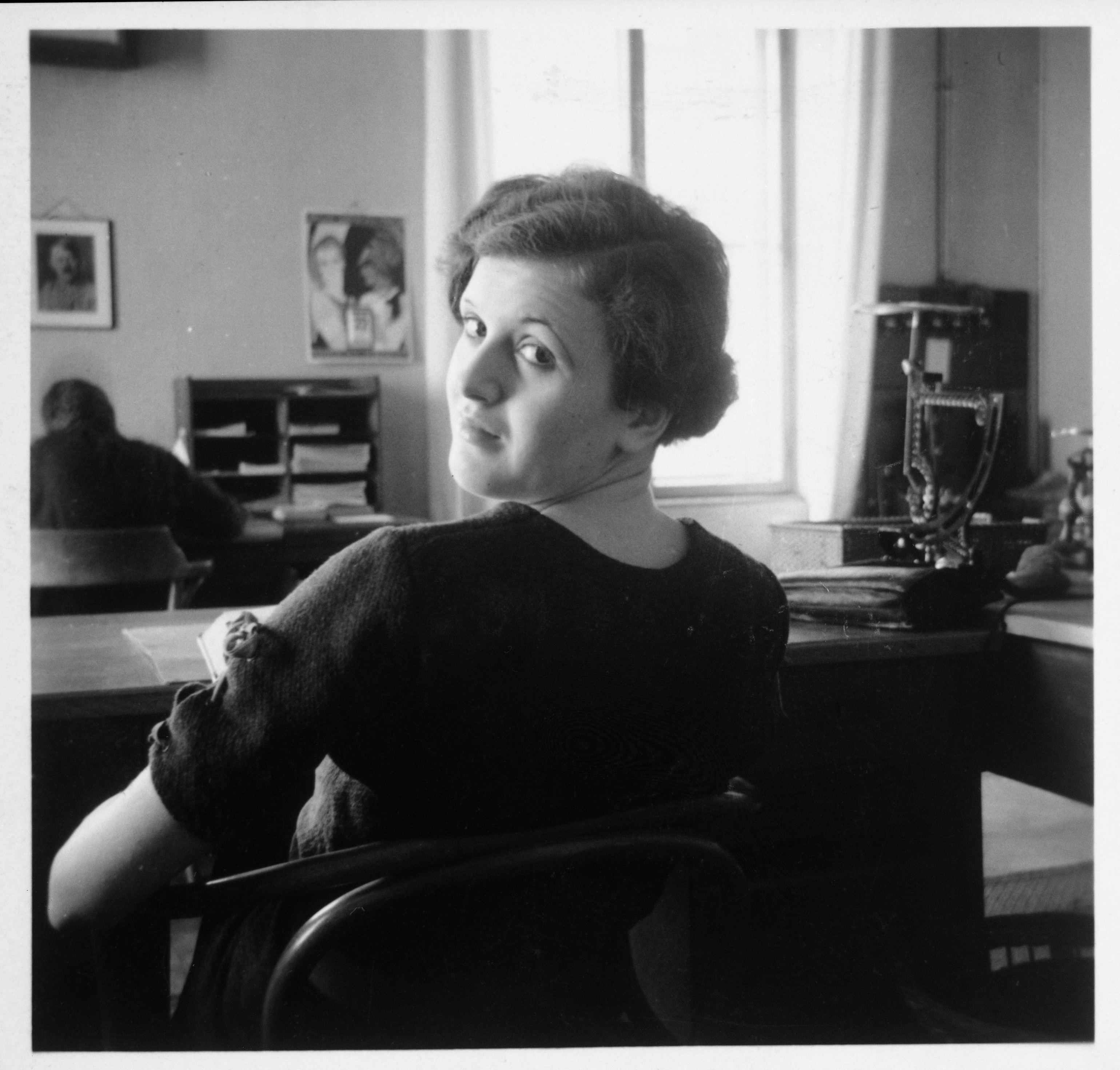
Gretl in Heinrich Hoffman's studio in the late 1930s

== With Eva at the Berghof ==
Gretl spent much time with Eva at Hitler's Berghof retreat in the Obersalzberg of the Bavarian Alps, where she enlivened the formal atmosphere by having fun, smoking, and flirting with the orderlies. According to Hitler's secretary, Traudl Junge, Hitler explained to her at length why he detested smoking, but she would not give up the habit. Gretl fell for Hitler's SS adjutant Fritz Darges, but he was suddenly dismissed by Hitler and posted to command a unit on the Eastern Front following an insubordinate comment at a meeting in 1944.

== Marriage ==
On 3 June 1944, she married SS-Gruppenführer Hermann Fegelein, who served as Reichsführer-SS Heinrich Himmler's liaison officer on Hitler's staff. Their wedding took place at the Mirabell Palace in Salzburg with Hitler, Himmler, and Martin Bormann as witnesses. Her sister Eva made all the wedding arrangements. A wedding reception at the Berghof and party at the Eagle's Nest at Obersalzberg lasted three days. The marriage provided Hitler with a formal link to Eva and a reason to include her at public functions. Fegelein was a known playboy and had many extramarital affairs.

== Downfall of the Third Reich ==
Three days after Gretl's wedding, the Normandy Landings took place. The social scene at the Berghof effectively ended on 14 July 1944, when Hitler left for his military headquarters, never to return. On 19 January 1945, Gretl and Eva arrived at the Reich Chancellery in Berlin, but they left for Berchtesgaden on 9 February. Eva later returned alone. On 23 April, she wrote her last letter to Gretl and included a request for her to destroy all her business papers, but to retain the personal correspondence or bury it. None of these documents have been found.

Gretl was pregnant and still at the Berghof when her husband was arrested for desertion on 28 April 1945 in an apartment in Berlin, having gone missing from the Führerbunker. Initially, out of consideration for Eva, Hitler considered ordering Fegelein assigned to the defence of Berlin. However, after learning of Himmler's offer to surrender to the western Allies, Hitler ordered Himmler arrested and Fegelein shot. Hitler married Eva Braun in the early morning hours of 29 April. On the afternoon of 30 April 1945, the couple died by suicide. On 5 May 1945, at Obersalzberg, Gretl gave birth to a daughter, whom she named Eva Barbara in memory of her sister. Eva Barbara died by suicide in 1971, after her boyfriend was killed in a car accident.

== Later life ==
Braun married Kurt Berlinghoff on 6 February 1954 in Munich. Her daughter Eva took the name Evi Fegelein-Berlinghoff. Gretl died on 10 October 1987 in Steingaden, Bavaria, aged 72.

On her tombstone, she is identified as Gretl Berlinghoff. Her second husband died on 4 January 1999. Gretl, her daughter Eva, Kurt Berlinghoff, and Ilse Braun are all buried next to each other.

== Bibliography ==
- Bullock, Alan (1999) [1952]. Hitler: A Study in Tyranny. New York: Konecky & Konecky. ISBN 1-56852-036-0.
- Görtemaker, Heike B. (2011). Eva Braun: Life with Hitler. New York: Alfred A. Knopf. ISBN 978-0-307-59582-9.
- Joachimsthaler, Anton (1999) [1995]. The Last Days of Hitler: The Legends, The Evidence, The Truth. Brockhampton Press. ISBN 978-1-86019-902-8.
- Junge, Traudl (2003). Müller, Melissa (ed.). Until the Final Hour: Hitler's Last Secretary. London: Weidenfeld & Nicolson. ISBN 978-0-297-84720-5.
- Kershaw, Ian (2008). Hitler: A Biography. W.W. Norton. ISBN 978-0-393-06757-6.
- Knopp, Guido (2003). Hitler's Women. New York: Routledge. ISBN 978-0-415-94730-5.
- Lambert, Angela (2006). The Lost Life of Eva Braun. London: Century. ISBN 978-1-84413-599-8.
- Linge, Heinz (2009) [1980]. With Hitler to the End: The Memoir of Hitler's Valet. Frontline Books-Skyhorse Publishing. ISBN 978-1-60239-804-7.
- Miller, Michael (2006). Leaders of the SS and German Police, Vol. 1. R. James Bender Publishing. ISBN 978-93-297-0037-2.
- Williamson, Gordon (2006). The SS: Hitler's Instrument of Terror. New York: Barnes & Noble Publishing. ISBN 978-0-7607-8168-5.
