= Gazeta Warszawska =

Defunct Polish daily newspaper

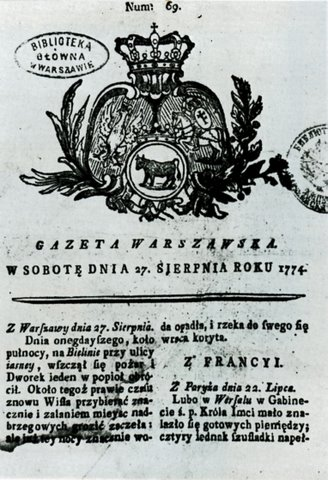
The front page of Gazeta Warszawska, 27 August 1774.

Gazeta Warszawska (lit. Warsaw Gazette) was the first newspaper published regularly in Warsaw for an extended period of time. Founded in 1774, it remained active under a variety of names until 1935. The names included the Gazeta Wolna Warszawska (Warsaw Independent Gazette; during the Warsaw Uprising (1794)) and Gazeta Poranna Warszawska, Warsaw Morning Gazette, after the merger with Gazeta Poranna, (2 grosze) in 1925.

Initially published by Stefan Łuskina, it remained his personal enterprise until 1793. Defunct after its founder's death, it was revived as a conservative newspaper the following year, this time as a private venture of the Lesznowski family. Among the notable editors of the newspaper were Józef Kenig (1859–1889), Maurycy Zamoyski (1906–1909) and Roman Dmowski (1910–1916). Disbanded in 1916, it was revived again in 1918, this time as an organ of the National Democrats. Drifting towards the far-right, it was officially banned by the Sanacja in 1935, after which it was continued until 1939 under the title Warszawski Dziennik Narodowy (Warsaw National Daily).

== The Jewish war of 1859 ==
In 1859, the Gazeta launched an infamous antisemitic campaign, known as the "Jewish war of 1859", against the Jewish bourgeoisie of Warsaw. Members of Polish Jewry sued Gazeta Warszawska for defamation but lost in court. Historian Joachim Lelewel and other democrats supported them, however, the readership appeared to be on the side of the leaders of the campaign. Later in the 19th century, the leaders of the Endecja political tendency praised the Gazeta for being the first forum in favour of Polish Integral nationalism, and considered it to be a predecessor of their movement: "[The Gazeta Warszawska] was the leading national paper which advocated the preservation of Polish national culture, fought against Jewish influence, and warned against the German threat long before the birth of Roman Dmowski".
