= List of Maccabiah records in athletics =

The Maccabiah Games is a quadrennial event which began in 1932. Events at the Games are divided into two groups: track and field events (including sprints, middle- and long-distance running, hurdling, relays, and field events), and road running (including a road 10K run and half marathon).

== Men's records ==
| Event | Record | Name | Nation | Date | Games | Place | Ref. |
|---|---|---|---|---|---|---|---|
| 100 m | 10.38 | Imri Persiado | Israel | 12 July 2017 | 2017 Maccabiah Games | (Note: Set in the heats -- Persiado ran 10.39, one one-hundredth of a second slower in the final.) | |
| 200 m | 21.09 | Gidon Jablonka | Israel | 2001 | 2001 Maccabiah Games | | |
| 400 m | 45.65 | Donald Sanford | Israel | 24 July 2013 | 2013 Maccabiah Games | | |
| 800 m | 1:49.29 | Mark Handelsman | Israel | 1985 | 1985 Maccabiah Games | | |
| 1500 m | 3:43.16 | James Espir | United Kingdom | 1981 | 1981 Maccabiah Games | | |
| 5000 m | 13:53.49 | James Espir | United Kingdom | 1981 | 1981 Maccabiah Games | | |
| Half marathon | 1:05:56 | Dan Schlesinger | United States | 1985 | 1985 Maccabiah Games | | |
| 110 m hurdles | 13.77 (+1.7 m/s) | Sagi Lamdiel | Israel | 5 July 2026 | 2026 Maccabiah Games | Jerusalem, Israel | |
| 400 m hurdles | 50.82 | Aleksey Bazarov | Israel | 1993 | 1993 Maccabiah Games | | |
| High jump | 2.28 m | Konstantin Matusevich | Israel | 1997 | 1997 Maccabiah Games | | |
| Pole vault | 5.60 m | Alex Averbukh | Israel | 2001 | 2001 Maccabiah Games | | |
| Long jump | 7.90 m | Niels Kruller | Netherlands | 1997 | 1997 Maccabiah Games | | |
| Triple jump | 16.77 m | Rogel Nachum | Israel | 1989 | 1989 Maccabiah Games | | |
| Shot put | 18.70 m | Gary Williky | United States | 1985 | 1985 Maccabiah Games | | |
| Discus throw | 58.98 m | Sergey Lukashok | Israel | 1993 | 1993 Maccabiah Games | | |
| Hammer throw | 78.06 m | Ken Flax | United States | 1989 | 1989 Maccabiah Games | | |
| Javelin throw | 76.44 m | Vadim Bavikin | Israel | 1993 | 1993 Maccabiah Games | | |
| 4 × 100 m relay | 40.21 | | Israel | 1993 | 1993 Maccabiah Games | | |
| 4 × 400 m relay | 3:12.6 | Ken Hendler; Steve Lamb; Roger Wolff; Bill Shapiro | United States | 1965 | 1965 Maccabiah Games | | |

== Women's records ==
| Event | Record | Name | Nation | Date | Games | Ref. |
|---|---|---|---|---|---|---|
| 100 m | 11.71 | Diana Vaisman | Israel | 12 July 2017 | 2017 Maccabiah Games | |
| 200 m | 23.78 | Maria Enkina | Russia | 2001 | 2001 Maccabiah Games | |
| 400 m | 53.26 | Olena Rurak | Ukraine | 2001 | 2001 Maccabiah Games | |
| 800 m | 2:04.18 | Edna Lankri | Israel | 1993 | 1993 Maccabiah Games | |
| 1500 m | 4:18.41 | Sasha Gollish | Canada | 12 July 2017 | 2017 Maccabiah Games | |
| 3000 m | 9:27.81 | Anat Meiri | Israel | 1981 | 1981 Maccabiah Games | |
| 5000 m | 16:22.97 | Sasha Gollish | Canada | 13 July 2017 | 2017 Maccabiah Games | |
| Half marathon | 1:17:37 | Sarah Strauss | United States | 1981 | 1981 Maccabiah Games | |
| 110 m hurdles | 13.47 | Irina Lenskiy | Israel | 2005 | 2005 Maccabiah Games | |
| 400 m hurdles | 1:00.03 | Darya Ukharskaya | Russia | 2005 | 2005 Maccabiah Games | |
| High jump | 1.85m | Svetlana Zalevskaya | Kazakhstan | 2001 | 2001 Maccabiah Games | |
| Pole vault | 4.24m | Jillian Schwartz | United States | 2009 | 2009 Maccabiah Games | |
| Long jump | 6.15m | Moran Katz | Israel | 2001 | 2001 Maccabiah Games | |
| Triple jump | 12.80m | Yulia Pushkaryov | Israel | 2009 | 2009 Maccabiah Games | |
| Shot put | 15.62m | Sivan Jean | Israel | 2005 | 2005 Maccabiah Games | |
| Discus throw | 50.00m | Sivan Jean | Israel | 2005 | 2005 Maccabiah Games | |
| Hammer throw | 56.05m | Yulia Rosenfeld | Russia | 2005 | 2005 Maccabiah Games | |
| Javelin throw | 42.62m | Dorit Naor | Israel | 2001 | 2001 Maccabiah Games | |
| 4 × 100 m relay | 47.31 | Russia | Russia | 2005 | 2005 Maccabiah Games | |
| 4 × 400 m relay | 3:43.40 | Israel | Israel | 1993 | 1993 Maccabiah Games | |

== See also ==
- Athletics at the Maccabiah Games
- List of Maccabiah medalists in athletics (men)
- List of Maccabiah medalists in athletics (women)
