= Athletics at the Maccabiah Games =

Athletics is one of several sports contested at the quadrennial Maccabiah Games competition. It has been a Maccabiah Games sport since the inaugural edition of the event in 1932.

Though not as competitive in recent years, several world-class and Olympic athletes have competed at the Games in the past, such as 1964 Olympic 4 × 100 metres relay medalist Gerry Ashworth (who competed in 1965), former shot put indoor world record holder Gary Gubner (in 1961), and 1932 Olympic discus throw gold medalist Lillian Copeland (in 1935).

== See also ==
- List of Maccabiah medalists in athletics (men)
- List of Maccabiah medalists in athletics (women)
- List of Maccabiah records in athletics
