= List of Maccabiah medalists in athletics (men) =

This is an incomplete list of men's Maccabiah medalists in track & field athletics from 1932 to the present.

== Current program ==
=== 100 metres ===
| Games | Gold | Silver | Bronze |
|---|---|---|---|
| 1932 Maccabiah | | | |
| 1935 Maccabiah | | | |
| 1950 Maccabiah | Ira Kaplan (USA) | | |
| 1953 Maccabiah | | | |
| 1957 Maccabiah | Harold Romberg (RSA); 10.4 CR | Al Jacobs (USA) | |
| 1961 Maccabiah | | | |
| 1965 Maccabiah | | | |
| 1969 Maccabiah | | | |
| 1973 Maccabiah | | | |
| 1977 Maccabiah | | | |
| 1981 Maccabiah | | | |
| 1985 Maccabiah | | | |
| 1989 Maccabiah | | | |
| 1993 Maccabiah | | | |
| 1997 Maccabiah | | | |
| 2001 Maccabiah | Konstantin Rurak (UKR); 10.45 CR | | |
| 2005 Maccabiah | | | |
| 2009 Maccabiah | | | |
| 2013 Maccabiah | | | |
| 2017 Maccabiah | Imri Persiado (ISR); 10.39 | Alexander Manuel (CAN) | Ary Djian (FRA) |

=== 110 metres hurdles ===
| Games | Gold | Silver | Bronze |
|---|---|---|---|
| 1932 Maccabiah | | | |
| 1935 Maccabiah | | | |
| 1950 Maccabiah | | | |
| 1953 Maccabiah | Harrison Dillard (USA) | | |
| 1957 Maccabiah | | | |
| 1961 Maccabiah | | | |
| 1965 Maccabiah | | | |
| 1969 Maccabiah | | | |
| 1973 Maccabiah | | | |
| 1977 Maccabiah | | | |
| 1981 Maccabiah | | | |
| 1985 Maccabiah | | | |
| 1989 Maccabiah | | | |
| 1993 Maccabiah | | | |
| 1997 Maccabiah | | | |
| 2001 Maccabiah | | | |
| 2005 Maccabiah | Yevgeniy Minenko (ISR); 14.33 CR | | |
| 2009 Maccabiah | | | |
| 2013 Maccabiah | Tomer Almogy (ISR); 14.48 | | |
| 2017 Maccabiah | Itamar Feiler (ISR); 14.25 CR | Tomer Almogy (ISR); 14.39 | |

=== 200 metres ===
| Games | Gold | Silver | Bronze |
|---|---|---|---|
| 1932 Maccabiah | | | |
| 1935 Maccabiah | | | |
| 1950 Maccabiah | | | |
| 1953 Maccabiah | | | |
| 1957 Maccabiah | Harold Romberg (RSA); CR | | |
| 1961 Maccabiah | | | |
| 1965 Maccabiah | | | |
| 1969 Maccabiah | | | |
| 1973 Maccabiah | | | |
| 1977 Maccabiah | | | |
| 1981 Maccabiah | | | |
| 1985 Maccabiah | | | |
| 1989 Maccabiah | | | |
| 1993 Maccabiah | | | |
| 1997 Maccabiah | | | |
| 2001 Maccabiah | Gidon Jablonka (ISR); 21.09 CR | | |
| 2005 Maccabiah | | | |
| 2009 Maccabiah | | | |
| 2013 Maccabiah | | | |
| 2017 Maccabiah | Dor Kollwitz (ISR); 21.79 | Omri Harush (ISR) | Alexander Manuel (CAN) |

=== 400 meters ===
| Games | Gold | Silver | Bronze |
|---|---|---|---|
| 1932 Maccabiah | | | |
| 1935 Maccabiah | | | |
| 1950 Maccabiah | | | |
| 1953 Maccabiah | | | |
| 1957 Maccabiah | | | |
| 1961 Maccabiah | | | |
| 1965 Maccabiah | | | |
| 1969 Maccabiah | | | |
| 1973 Maccabiah | | | |
| 1977 Maccabiah | | | |
| 1981 Maccabiah | | | |
| 1985 Maccabiah | Mark Rosenberg (AUS); 46.54 CR | | |
| 1989 Maccabiah | | | |
| 1993 Maccabiah | | | |
| 1997 Maccabiah | | | |
| 2001 Maccabiah | | | |
| 2005 Maccabiah | | | |
| 2009 Maccabiah | | | |
| 2013 Maccabiah | Donald Sanford (ISR); 45.65 CR NR | Steven Solomon (AUS); 46.2 | Eliakim Roi (ISR); 50.73 |
| 2017 Maccabiah | Yuri Shapsay (ISR); 49.09 | | Gabriel Silva (BRA) |

=== 400 metres hurdles ===
| Games | Gold | Silver | Bronze |
|---|---|---|---|
| 1932 Maccabiah | | | |
| 1935 Maccabiah | | | |
| 1950 Maccabiah | | | |
| 1953 Maccabiah | | | |
| 1957 Maccabiah | Harry Kane (ENG); 54.2 | | |
| 1961 Maccabiah | | | |
| 1965 Maccabiah | | | |
| 1969 Maccabiah | | | |
| 1973 Maccabiah | | | |
| 1977 Maccabiah | | | |
| 1981 Maccabiah | | | |
| 1985 Maccabiah | | | |
| 1989 Maccabiah | | | |
| 1993 Maccabiah | | | |
| 1997 Maccabiah | | | |
| 2001 Maccabiah | | | |
| 2005 Maccabiah | | | |
| 2009 Maccabiah | | | |
| 2013 Maccabiah | | | |
| 2017 Maccabiah | Khai Cohen (ISR); 53.32 | | |

=== 800 metres ===
| Games | Gold | Silver | Bronze |
|---|---|---|---|
| 1932 Maccabiah | | | |
| 1935 Maccabiah | | | |
| 1950 Maccabiah | | | |
| 1953 Maccabiah | George Traub (RSA); 1:53.8 CR | Lew Stieglitz (USA) | |
| 1957 Maccabiah | | | |
| 1961 Maccabiah | | | |
| 1965 Maccabiah | | | |
| 1969 Maccabiah | | | |
| 1973 Maccabiah | | | |
| 1977 Maccabiah | | | |
| 1981 Maccabiah | | | |
| 1985 Maccabiah | Mark Handelsman (ISR); 1:49.29 CR | | |
| 1989 Maccabiah | | | |
| 1993 Maccabiah | | | |
| 1997 Maccabiah | | | |
| 2001 Maccabiah | | | |
| 2005 Maccabiah | | | |
| 2009 Maccabiah | | | |
| 2013 Maccabiah | | | |
| 2017 Maccabiah | Abergel Alon (ISR) | Samuel Goldstein (USA) | Admasu Geto (ISR) |

=== 1500 metres ===
| Games | Gold | Silver | Bronze |
|---|---|---|---|
| 1932 Maccabiah | | | |
| 1935 Maccabiah | | | |
| 1950 Maccabiah | | | |
| 1953 Maccabiah | | | |
| 1957 Maccabiah | | | |
| 1961 Maccabiah | Lew Stieglitz (USA); 3:55 CR | | |
| 1965 Maccabiah | Ray Rosenman (GBR); 3:51.2 CR | | |
| 1969 Maccabiah | | | |
| 1973 Maccabiah | | | |
| 1977 Maccabiah | | | |
| 1981 Maccabiah | James Espir (GBR); 3:43.16 CR | | |
| 1985 Maccabiah | James Espir (GBR) | | |
| 1989 Maccabiah | | | |
| 1993 Maccabiah | Josef Kobir (CAN) | | |
| 1997 Maccabiah | | | |
| 2001 Maccabiah | | | |
| 2005 Maccabiah | | | |
| 2009 Maccabiah | | | |
| 2013 Maccabiah | Yimer Getahun (ISR); 3:50.03 | Russell Brown (USA); 3:50.09 | |
| 2017 Maccabiah | Yimer Getahun (ISR); 3:54.92 | Samuel Goldstein (USA) | Balechao Godedao (ISR) |

=== 5000 metres ===
| Games | Gold | Silver | Bronze |
|---|---|---|---|
| 1932 Maccabiah | | | |
| 1935 Maccabiah | | | |
| 1950 Maccabiah | | | |
| 1953 Maccabiah | | | |
| 1957 Maccabiah | | | |
| 1961 Maccabiah | | | |
| 1965 Maccabiah | | | |
| 1969 Maccabiah | | | |
| 1973 Maccabiah | | | |
| 1977 Maccabiah | | | |
| 1981 Maccabiah | James Espir (GBR); 13:53.49 CR | Arie Gamliel (ISR); 13:56.83 | Yair Karni (ISR); 14:30.27 |
| 1985 Maccabiah | | | |
| 1989 Maccabiah | | | |
| 1993 Maccabiah | Josef Kobir (CAN) | | |
| 1997 Maccabiah | | | |
| 2001 Maccabiah | | | |
| 2005 Maccabiah | | | |
| 2009 Maccabiah | | | |
| 2013 Maccabiah | | | |
| 2017 Maccabiah | Adam Lipschitz (ZAF) | Gashau Ayale (ISR) | Demeke Teshale (ISR) |

=== 10K run (road race) ===
| Games | Gold | Silver | Bronze |
|---|---|---|---|
| 1932 Maccabiah | | | |
| 1935 Maccabiah | | | |
| 1950 Maccabiah | | | |
| 1953 Maccabiah | | | |
| 1957 Maccabiah | | | |
| 1961 Maccabiah | | | |
| 1965 Maccabiah | | | |
| 1969 Maccabiah | | | |
| 1973 Maccabiah | Gary Cohen (NED); CR | | |
| 1977 Maccabiah | | | |
| 1981 Maccabiah | | | |
| 1985 Maccabiah | | | |
| 1989 Maccabiah | | | |
| 1993 Maccabiah | Josef Kobir (CAN) | | |
| 1997 Maccabiah | | | |
| 2001 Maccabiah | | | |
| 2005 Maccabiah | | | |
| 2009 Maccabiah | | | |
| 2013 Maccabiah | Cameron Marantz (USA); 32:11 | | |
| 2017 Maccabiah | Adam Lipschitz (ZAF); 33:21 | Craig Huff (USA); 34:00 | Jonathan Werble (USA); 37:45 |

=== 4×100 metre relay ===
| Games | Gold | Silver | Bronze |
|---|---|---|---|
| 1932 Maccabiah | | | |
| 1935 Maccabiah | | | |
| 1950 Maccabiah | | | |
| 1953 Maccabiah | | | |
| 1957 Maccabiah | | | |
| 1961 Maccabiah | | | |
| 1965 Maccabiah | United States (USA); Gerry Ashworth; Jay Paritz; Dick Robinson; Dick Sheer; 42.4 CR | | |
| 1969 Maccabiah | | | |
| 1973 Maccabiah | | | |
| 1977 Maccabiah | | | |
| 1981 Maccabiah | | | |
| 1985 Maccabiah | | | |
| 1989 Maccabiah | | | |
| 1993 Maccabiah | Israel (ISR); 40.21 CR | | |
| 1997 Maccabiah | | | |
| 2001 Maccabiah | | | |
| 2005 Maccabiah | | | |
| 2009 Maccabiah | | | |
| 2013 Maccabiah | Israel (ISR); 40.93 | United States (USA); 41.85 | Mixed Team; 44.19 |
| 2017 Maccabiah | Israel (ISR); 40.64 | United States (USA) | |

=== 4×400 metre relay ===
| Games | Gold | Silver | Bronze |
|---|---|---|---|
| 1932 Maccabiah | | | |
| 1935 Maccabiah | | | |
| 1950 Maccabiah | | | |
| 1953 Maccabiah | | | |
| 1957 Maccabiah | | | |
| 1961 Maccabiah | | | |
| 1965 Maccabiah | United States (USA); Ken Hendler; Steve Lamb; Roger Wolff; Bill Shapiro; 3:12.6 CR | | |
| 1969 Maccabiah | | | |
| 1973 Maccabiah | | | |
| 1977 Maccabiah | | | |
| 1981 Maccabiah | | | |
| 1985 Maccabiah | | | |
| 1989 Maccabiah | | | |
| 1993 Maccabiah | | | |
| 1997 Maccabiah | | | |
| 2001 Maccabiah | | | |
| 2005 Maccabiah | | | |
| 2009 Maccabiah | United States (USA); Ari Monosson; Ben Auerbach; Jeffrey Merrill; Dustin Emrani; 03:17.08 | | |
| 2013 Maccabiah | Israel (ISR); 3:13.80 | United States (USA); 3:43.67 | Mixed Team; 3:56.72 |
| 2017 Maccabiah | Israel (ISR) | United States (USA) | Canada (CAN) |

=== Half marathon (excluding masters divisions) ===
| Games | Gold | Silver | Bronze |
|---|---|---|---|
| 1932 Maccabiah | | | |
| 1935 Maccabiah | | | |
| 1950 Maccabiah | | | |
| 1953 Maccabiah | | | |
| 1957 Maccabiah | | | |
| 1961 Maccabiah | | | |
| 1965 Maccabiah | | | |
| 1969 Maccabiah | | | |
| 1973 Maccabiah | | | |
| 1977 Maccabiah | | | |
| 1981 Maccabiah | | | |
| 1985 Maccabiah | Dan Schlesinger (USA); 1:05:56 CR | | |
| 1989 Maccabiah | | | |
| 1993 Maccabiah | | | |
| 1997 Maccabiah | | | |
| 2001 Maccabiah | | | |
| 2005 Maccabiah | | | |
| 2009 Maccabiah | | | |
| 2013 Maccabiah | | | |
| 2017 Maccabiah | Roee Zoarets (ISR) | Edan Apsimon (ISR) | Noam Ronen (ISR) |

=== High jump ===
| Games | Gold | Silver | Bronze |
|---|---|---|---|
| 1932 Maccabiah | | | |
| 1935 Maccabiah | | | |
| 1950 Maccabiah | | | |
| 1953 Maccabiah | | | |
| 1957 Maccabiah | | | |
| 1961 Maccabiah | | | |
| 1965 Maccabiah | | | |
| 1969 Maccabiah | | | |
| 1973 Maccabiah | Jeffery Fried | | |
| 1977 Maccabiah | | | |
| 1981 Maccabiah | | | |
| 1985 Maccabiah | | | |
| 1989 Maccabiah | | | |
| 1993 Maccabiah | | | |
| 1997 Maccabiah | | | |
| 2001 Maccabiah | | | |
| 2005 Maccabiah | | | |
| 2009 Maccabiah | | | |
| 2013 Maccabiah | | | |
| 2017 Maccabiah | Dimitriy Kroytor (ISR)} 2.13m | Niki Palli (ISR); 2.05m Tzur Lieberman (ISR); 2.05m | none awarded |

=== Pole vault ===
| Games | Gold | Silver | Bronze |
|---|---|---|---|
| 1932 Maccabiah | | | |
| 1935 Maccabiah | | | |
| 1950 Maccabiah | | | |
| 1953 Maccabiah | | | |
| 1957 Maccabiah | | | |
| 1961 Maccabiah | Mike Herman (USA) | | |
| 1965 Maccabiah | | | |
| 1969 Maccabiah | | | |
| 1973 Maccabiah | | | |
| 1977 Maccabiah | | | |
| 1981 Maccabiah | | | |
| 1985 Maccabiah | | | |
| 1989 Maccabiah | | | |
| 1993 Maccabiah | | | |
| 1997 Maccabiah | | | |
| 2001 Maccabiah | Alex Averbukh (ISR); 5.60m CR | | |
| 2005 Maccabiah | | | |
| 2009 Maccabiah | Igor Pavlov (RUS); 5.55m | Brian Mondschein (USA); 5.40m | Yevgeniy Olkhovskiy (USA); 5.10m |
| 2013 Maccabiah | Alex Averbukh (ISR); 5.15m | Lev Skorish (ISR); 5.00m | |
| 2017 Maccabiah | Denis Goldovsky (ISR); 4.70m | Roman Kogan (ISR) | Karni Ehud (ISR) |

=== Long jump ===
| Games | Gold | Silver | Bronze |
|---|---|---|---|
| 1932 Maccabiah | | | |
| 1935 Maccabiah | | | |
| 1950 Maccabiah | | | |
| 1953 Maccabiah | David Kushnir (ISR) | | |
| 1957 Maccabiah | David Kushnir (ISR) | | |
| 1961 Maccabiah | Mike Herman (USA) | | |
| 1965 Maccabiah | | | |
| 1969 Maccabiah | | | |
| 1973 Maccabiah | | | |
| 1977 Maccabiah | | | |
| 1981 Maccabiah | | | |
| 1985 Maccabiah | | | |
| 1989 Maccabiah | | | |
| 1993 Maccabiah | | | |
| 1997 Maccabiah | | | |
| 2001 Maccabiah | | | |
| 2005 Maccabiah | | | |
| 2009 Maccabiah | | | |
| 2013 Maccabiah | | | |
| 2017 Maccabiah | Gilron Tsabkevich (ISR); 7.27m | Aviram Shwarzbard (ISR) | |

=== Triple jump ===
| Games | Gold | Silver | Bronze |
|---|---|---|---|
| 1932 Maccabiah | | | |
| 1935 Maccabiah | | | |
| 1950 Maccabiah | | | |
| 1953 Maccabiah | | | |
| 1957 Maccabiah | | | |
| 1961 Maccabiah | | | |
| 1965 Maccabiah | | | |
| 1969 Maccabiah | | | |
| 1973 Maccabiah | | | |
| 1977 Maccabiah | | | |
| 1981 Maccabiah | | | |
| 1985 Maccabiah | | | |
| 1989 Maccabiah | | | |
| 1993 Maccabiah | | | |
| 1997 Maccabiah | | | |
| 2001 Maccabiah | | | |
| 2005 Maccabiah | | | |
| 2009 Maccabiah | | | |
| 2013 Maccabiah | | | |
| 2017 Maccabiah | Yorai Shaul (ISR); 14.97m | | |

=== Discus throw ===
| Games | Gold | Silver | Bronze |
|---|---|---|---|
| 1932 Maccabiah | | | |
| 1935 Maccabiah | | | |
| 1950 Maccabiah | | | |
| 1953 Maccabiah | | | |
| 1957 Maccabiah | | | |
| 1961 Maccabiah | Gary Gubner (USA) | | |
| 1965 Maccabiah | | | |
| 1969 Maccabiah | | | |
| 1973 Maccabiah | Gary Wolf (USA) | | |
| 1977 Maccabiah | | | |
| 1981 Maccabiah | Gary Williky (USA); 57.18 m | Larry Rosen (USA) | |
| 1985 Maccabiah | Gary Williky (USA) | | |
| 1989 Maccabiah | | | |
| 1993 Maccabiah | | | |
| 1997 Maccabiah | | | |
| 2001 Maccabiah | | | |
| 2005 Maccabiah | | | |
| 2009 Maccabiah | | | |
| 2013 Maccabiah | | | |
| 2017 Maccabiah | Itamar Levi (ISR); 54.73 | Dennis Valliulin (ISR); 52.67 | Mark Alterman (ISR); 51.73 |

=== Shot put ===
| Games | Gold | Silver | Bronze |
|---|---|---|---|
| 1932 Maccabiah | | | |
| 1935 Maccabiah | | | |
| 1950 Maccabiah | | | |
| 1953 Maccabiah | | | |
| 1957 Maccabiah | | | |
| 1961 Maccabiah | Gary Gubner (USA) | | |
| 1965 Maccabiah | | | |
| 1969 Maccabiah | | | |
| 1973 Maccabiah | | | |
| 1977 Maccabiah | | | |
| 1981 Maccabiah | Gary Williky (USA); 18.02m | Howard Horowitz (USA); 17.00m | |
| 1985 Maccabiah | Gary Williky (USA); 18.70m | Howard Horowitz (USA) | |
| 1989 Maccabiah | | | |
| 1993 Maccabiah | | | |
| 1997 Maccabiah | | | |
| 2001 Maccabiah | | | |
| 2005 Maccabiah | | | |
| 2009 Maccabiah | | | |
| 2013 Maccabiah | | | |
| 2017 Maccabiah | Itamar Levi (ISR); 18.00m | | |

=== Javelin throw ===
| Games | Gold | Silver | Bronze |
|---|---|---|---|
| 1932 Maccabiah | | | |
| 1935 Maccabiah | | | |
| 1950 Maccabiah | | | |
| 1953 Maccabiah | | | |
| 1957 Maccabiah | | | |
| 1961 Maccabiah | | | |
| 1965 Maccabiah | | | |
| 1969 Maccabiah | | | |
| 1973 Maccabiah | Joseph Gould (USA); 71.36m | | |
| 1977 Maccabiah | | | |
| 1981 Maccabiah | | | |
| 1985 Maccabiah | Charles Greene (USA); 69.60m | | |
| 1989 Maccabiah | | | |
| 1993 Maccabiah | | | |
| 1997 Maccabiah | | | |
| 2001 Maccabiah | | | |
| 2005 Maccabiah | | | |
| 2009 Maccabiah | | | |
| 2013 Maccabiah | | | |
| 2017 Maccabiah | Daniel Freeman (USA) | Gilimovich Nikolai (ISR) | Arad Asael (ISR) |

=== Hammer throw ===
| Games | Gold | Silver | Bronze |
|---|---|---|---|
| 1932 Maccabiah | | | |
| 1935 Maccabiah | | | |
| 1950 Maccabiah | | | |
| 1953 Maccabiah | | | |
| 1957 Maccabiah | Martin Engel (USA); 192 ft CR | | |
| 1961 Maccabiah | | | |
| 1965 Maccabiah | | | |
| 1969 Maccabiah | | | |
| 1973 Maccabiah | | | |
| 1977 Maccabiah | | | |
| 1981 Maccabiah | | | |
| 1985 Maccabiah | | | |
| 1989 Maccabiah | Ken Flax (USA); 78.06m CR | | |
| 1993 Maccabiah | | | |
| 1997 Maccabiah | | | |
| 2001 Maccabiah | | | |
| 2005 Maccabiah | | | |
| 2009 Maccabiah | | | |
| 2013 Maccabiah | | | |
| 2017 Maccabiah | Viktor Zaginaiko (ISR); 55.56m | | |

== Discontinued events ==
=== 200 metres hurdles ===
| Games | Gold | Silver | Bronze |
|---|---|---|---|
| 1932 Maccabiah | | | |
| 1935 Maccabiah | | | |
| 1950 Maccabiah | | | |
| 1953 Maccabiah | | | |
| 1957 Maccabiah | | Harry Kane (USA); 25.3 | |
| 1961 Maccabiah | | | |
| 1965 Maccabiah | | | |
| 1969 Maccabiah | | | |
| 1973 Maccabiah | | | |
| 1977 Maccabiah | | | |
| 1981 Maccabiah | | | |
| 1985 Maccabiah | | | |
| 1989 Maccabiah | | | |
| 1993 Maccabiah | | | |
| 1997 Maccabiah | | | |
| 2001 Maccabiah | | | |
| 2005 Maccabiah | | | |
| 2009 Maccabiah | | | |
| 2013 Maccabiah | | | |

=== 3000 meters race walk ===
| Games | Gold | Silver | Bronze |
|---|---|---|---|
| 1932 Maccabiah | | | |
| 1935 Maccabiah | | | |
| 1950 Maccabiah | Henry Laskau (USA) | | |
| 1953 Maccabiah | Henry Laskau (USA) | | |
| 1957 Maccabiah | Henry Laskau (USA); 14 minutes | | |
| 1961 Maccabiah | | | |
| 1965 Maccabiah | Henry Laskau (USA) | | |
| 1969 Maccabiah | Shaul Ladany (ISR); 13:35.4 | | |
| 1973 Maccabiah | | | |
| 1977 Maccabiah | | | |
| 1981 Maccabiah | | | |
| 1985 Maccabiah | | | |
| 1989 Maccabiah | | | |
| 1993 Maccabiah | | | |
| 1997 Maccabiah | | | |
| 2001 Maccabiah | | | |
| 2005 Maccabiah | | | |
| 2009 Maccabiah | | | |
| 2013 Maccabiah | | | |

=== 20 kilometers race walk ===
| Games | Gold | Silver | Bronze |
|---|---|---|---|
| 1932 Maccabiah | | | |
| 1935 Maccabiah | | | |
| 1950 Maccabiah | | | |
| 1953 Maccabiah | | | |
| 1957 Maccabiah | | | |
| 1961 Maccabiah | | | |
| 1965 Maccabiah | | | |
| 1969 Maccabiah | | | |
| 1973 Maccabiah | Shaul Ladany (ISR); 1:37.54 | | |
| 1977 Maccabiah | | | |
| 1981 Maccabiah | | | |
| 1985 Maccabiah | | | |
| 1989 Maccabiah | | | |
| 1993 Maccabiah | | | |
| 1997 Maccabiah | | | |
| 2001 Maccabiah | | | |
| 2005 Maccabiah | | | |
| 2009 Maccabiah | | | |
| 2013 Maccabiah | | | |

=== 50 kilometers race walk ===
| Games | Gold | Silver | Bronze |
|---|---|---|---|
| 1932 Maccabiah | | | |
| 1935 Maccabiah | | | |
| 1950 Maccabiah | | | |
| 1953 Maccabiah | | | |
| 1957 Maccabiah | | | |
| 1961 Maccabiah | | | |
| 1965 Maccabiah | | | |
| 1969 Maccabiah | | | |
| 1973 Maccabiah | Shaul Ladany (ISR) | | |
| 1977 Maccabiah | | | |
| 1981 Maccabiah | | | |
| 1985 Maccabiah | | | |
| 1989 Maccabiah | | | |
| 1993 Maccabiah | | | |
| 1997 Maccabiah | | | |
| 2001 Maccabiah | | | |
| 2005 Maccabiah | | | |
| 2009 Maccabiah | | | |
| 2013 Maccabiah | | | |

=== Decathlon ===
| Games | Gold | Silver | Bronze |
|---|---|---|---|
| 1932 Maccabiah | | | |
| 1935 Maccabiah | | | |
| 1950 Maccabiah | | | |
| 1953 Maccabiah | | | |
| 1957 Maccabiah | | | |
| 1961 Maccabiah | Mike Herman (USA) | | |
| 1965 Maccabiah | | | |
| 1969 Maccabiah | | | |
| 1973 Maccabiah | | | |
| 1977 Maccabiah | | | |
| 1981 Maccabiah | Brian Mondschein (USA); 7359 CR | Marc Kibort (USA); 6485 | Gordon Orlikow (CAN); 5916 |
| 1985 Maccabiah | | | |
| 1989 Maccabiah | | | |
| 1993 Maccabiah | | | |
| 1997 Maccabiah | | | |
| 2001 Maccabiah | | | |
| 2005 Maccabiah | | | |
| 2009 Maccabiah | | | |
| 2013 Maccabiah | | | |
