= Shawn Lipman =

US international rugby union player

- Born: 25 September 1964 (age 62) Johannesburg, South Africa

Rugby union career
- Position: Flanker
International career
Years	Team	Apps	(Points)
1988–1991	United States	9	(0)
Medal record
Representing United States
Men's rugby union
Maccabiah Games
Gold medal – first place	1985	Team competition
Bronze medal – third place	1989	Team competition
Silver medal – second place	1993	Team competition
Gold medal – first place	1997	Team competition
Bronze medal – third place	2009	Team competition
Bronze medal – third place	2013	Team competition
Gold medal – first place	2017	Team competition
Men's rugby sevens
Maccabiah Games
Gold medal – first place	2013	Team competition

Gold Medal Rugby Champions 2017 Maccabiah Games

Shawn Lipman (born 25 September 1964) is an American South African-born rugby union player.

He was inducted into the US Rugby Hall of Fame in 2019, together with US Internationals Luke Gross and Vaea Anitoni. Lipman was also inducted into the National Jewish Sports Hall of Fame in 2004, with others such as Sandy Koufax, Mark Spitz, and Shawn Green.

Lipman has been inducted into four other sporting Halls of Fame; the USA Maccabiah Rugby Hall of Fame, Santa Monica Rugby Club Hall of Fame, Southern California Jewish Sports Hall of Fame and Legends of the Maccabiah.

== United States ==
Born in Johannesburg, South Africa, Lipman was capped nine times for the United States in tests, including three 1991 Rugby World Cup games. Including non-test games, he has played in over 20 international matches.

Lipman joined Wits University Rugby Club at Under-20 level in 1983, from Sandringham High School, where he was a first team player, having received full colours in rugby. He represented Transvaal Under-20s whilst playing at Wits and also South Africa in the 1985 Maccabiah Games.

He represented the United States in the 1991 Rugby World Cup. Lipman also represented the US national team in over 20 international matches, including 9 test matches. Lipman played against some of the best national teams and players in the world, including the New Zealand All Blacks, England, and France.

Lipman had a very successful run in the Maccabiah Games, held every four years, having captained the US team in the 1993 Maccabiah Games and the 1997 Maccabiah Games, and represented the US in the 1989 Maccabiah Games and South Africa in the 1985 Maccabiah Games. He was selected as MVP of the Maccabiah Games Rugby Event in 1989, 1993, and 1997. In the Maccabiah competition, he won gold in 1985; bronze in 1989; silver in 1993; and gold in 1997. He was elected as the flag bearer for the United States delegation in 1997.

Lipman toured South Africa in 1988 with the Pacific Coast Grizzlies, playing against the top provincial teams in South Africa, including Western Province, South African Defence, Eastern Transvaal, and with victories against Natal, Orange Free State, and Boland.

Lipman was inducted into the USA's National Jewish Sports Hall of Fame in 2004 along with some of the best professional athletes in the United States, including Mark Spitz. He earned the MVP of the Year Award at the Santa Monica Rugby Club eight times, and in 2006 was also inducted into that club's Hall of Fame.

In 2009 Lipman came out of retirement at the age of 44 to represent the United States at the 2009 Maccabiah Games, winning a bronze medal. This culminated a 24-year career of playing at the Maccabiah Games, winning 2 Gold Medals, 1 Silver, and 2 Bronze Medals as a player.

In June 2011 he was inducted into his third sports hall of fame. Along with Taylor Mays of the San Francisco 49ers and Doug Gottlieb of ESPN, Lipman was inducted into the Southern California Jewish Sports Hall of Fame.

In 2013 he was head coach of the USA Maccabi Rugby Team that competed at the 19th World Games. The team won the gold medal in sevens, and the bronze medal in fifteens.

In 2017, Lipman led the US team to the 20th 2017 Maccabiah Games as head coach, and together with US international star Zack Test and with the team captained by US Eagle Kevin Swiryn, the team won the gold medal in fifteens, beating the favored South African side 31–21. Lipman is the only player to ever win a gold medal for rugby at the Maccabiah Games both as a player and coach.

Lipman was inducted into the Maccabi USA Rugby Hall of Fame in 2018, and the US Rugby Hall of Fame in 2019. In 2021 he was named to the All American List of best US Rugby Players.

In 2022 he was named as a Legend of the Maccabiah, the highest honor bestowed by USA Maccabi, along with other former and current professional athletes Doug Gottlieb, Chelsey Goldberg, Benny Feilhaber, and Olympic swimmer Andi Murez.

== Maccabiah Games ==
Shawn Lipman-Santa Monica Rugby Club

- Captained the US Maccabiah Team at the 1997 and 1993 Maccabiah World Games, winning Gold 1997, Silver 1993.
- Represented the US Maccabiah Team at the 1989 Maccabiah World Games, winning Bronze and South Africa in 1985, winning Gold
- Selected Most Valuable Player of the Games in 1989, 1993, and 1997
- Flag Bearer for the United States delegation at the 1997 Maccabiah World Games
- Represented US Maccabiah Team at the 2009 Maccabiah World Games, winning Bronze
- Selected as head coach of the US Maccabiah Rugby Team for the 2013 World Games
- Coached the US team to a Gold Medal in Rugby Sevens in 2013
- Coached the US team to a Bronze Medal in Rugby Fifteens in 2013
- Most medals won by an open athlete in team sports ever at the World Maccabiah Games
- Coached Team USA to win the gold medal at the 2017 Maccabiah Games.
- Only person to win a Gold Medal as a player and coach in Rugby at the World Maccabiah Games

== Honors and biography ==
- Named as one of Best 50 US internationals by a national sports publication
- Inducted into the National Jewish Sports Hall of Fame in 2004, with others such as Sandy Koufax, Mark Spitz, and Shawn Green.
- Represented Transvaal Under-20 provincial representative side in South Africa
- Selected as MVP of the Santa Monica Rugby Club in seven seasons
- Represented US representative side at the Melrose Sevens
- Represented the US against international sides, including
  - New Zealand
  - France
  - England
  - Russia
  - Japan
  - Canada
  - Romania
  - South Africa
  - Italy
  - Israel

On 26 June 2011, he was inducted into the Southern California Jewish Sports Hall of Fame.

- Full Colors – Sandringham High School (1982)
- Rugby Scholarship – University of the Witwatersrand (1983 to 1985)
- Most Improved Player – University of Witwatersrand (1983)
- University Half Blues – University of Witwatersrand (1984)
- Gold Medal – World Maccabiah Games (1985)
- Most Valuable Forward – Santa Monica Rugby Club (1988)
- Craig Sweeney Award (MVP) – Santa Monica Rugby Club (1989)
- Most Valuable Player – World Maccabiah Games (1989)
- Bronze Medal – World Maccabiah Games (1989)
- Most Valuable Forward – Tucson International Tournament (1990)
- Most Valuable Forward – Santa Monica Rugby Club (1991)
- Craig Sweeney Award (MVP) – Santa Monica Rugby Club (1991)
- Craig Sweeney Award (MVP) – Santa Monica Rugby Club (1992)
- Craig Sweeney Award (MVP) – Santa Monica Rugby Club (1993)
- Most Valuable Player – World Maccabiah Games (1993)
- Silver Medal – World Maccabiah Games (1993)
- Most Valuable Forward – Santa Monica Rugby Club (1995)
- Flag Bearer for the United States delegation - Maccabiah World Games (1997)
- Most Valuable Player – World Maccabiah Games (1997)
- Gold Medal – World Maccabiah Games (1997)
- Hall of Fame Inductee – National Jewish Sports Hall of Fame (2004)
- Hall of Fame Inductee – Santa Monica Rugby Club (2006)
- Most Valuable Player – Huntington Beach Sevens Open Tournament (2006)
- Bronze Medal – World Maccabiah Games (2009)
- Hall of Fame Inductee- Southern Calif. Jewish Sports Hall of Fame (2011)
- Gold Medal – World Maccabiah Games Rugby Sevens (2013)
- Bronze Medal – World Maccabiah Games Rugby (2013)
- Gold Medal – World Maccabiah Games Rugby (2017)
- Hall of Fame Inductee – Maccabi USA Rugby Hall of Fame (2018)
- Hall of Fame Inductee – US Rugby Hall of Fame (2019)
- All American List – Named to the All American List of best US Rugby Players (2021)
- Legend of the Maccabiah – highest honor bestowed by USA Maccabi (2022)

== Youth Rugby ==
Lipman founded the West Valley Wolverines Youth Rugby Club in 2003, and was the head coach and president until 2010. The club began with his two sons and 8 other children and grew to more than 100 players. The club focused on fun and development in introducing rugby to children aged between 5 and 12 in the West San Fernando Valley.

== Professional career ==
Lipman is also an entrepreneur who has started and sold companies in the healthcare, real estate, entertainment, technology, and eCommerce spaces. He co-founded and served as CEO of a global product feed technology company, Feedonomics.

In 2023 Shawn won a Stevie Award in the 21st Annual American Business Awards (ABA) for "Technology Executive of the Year!" The ABA received more than 3,700 nominations for this category, and Shawn was one of six selected by a panel of judges for this prestigious honor based on factors including his success in building a winning company culture, industry-leading retention rates, exceptional leadership, commitment to innovation, and global satisfaction scores.

== See also ==
- List of select Jewish rugby union players
