= Maccabiah (disambiguation) =

Maccabiah may refer to:

- Maccabiah Games, a quadrennial international Jewish and Israeli multi-sport competition
  - Maccabiah sports, the sports played at the Maccabiah Games
- Maccabiah Stadium

== See also ==
- Maccabees (disambiguation)
- Maccabeus (disambiguation)
- Maccabi (disambiguation)
