= Maccabeus =

Maccabeus or Machabeus may refer to:

- Maccabeus (worm), a sole genus of Seticoronarian priapulid worm
- Judas Maccabeus, a Kohen (Jewish priest) who led a revolt against the Seleucid Empire
- Gilla Mo Chaidbeo, Irish abbot (d. 1174), also known as Maccabeus or Machabeus
- Rudolf, Count of Montescaglioso, also known as Maccabeus

== See also ==
- Maccabees (disambiguation)
- Maccabi (disambiguation)
- Maccabiah (disambiguation)
