= Marlene Bruten =

Mexican swimmer (born 1969)

Personal information
- Nationality: Mexican
- Born: 18 June 1969 (age 57)

Sport
- Sport: Swimming
- Strokes: Butterfly, Individual Medley (IM)
- Club: Federación Mexicana de Natación

Marlene Bruten (born 18 June 1969) is a Mexican swimmer. She competed in four events at the 1988 Summer Olympics.

She won a silver medal in the 200 m butterfly at the 1989 Maccabiah Games, in Israel. In 1988, she went to the Olympics for 100 fly, 200 fly, 200 IM, and 400 IM. She now coaches at Katy Aquatics as an assistant coach.
