= Maccabees (disambiguation) =

The Maccabees were Jewish rebel warriors who fought against Greco-Roman Hellenization in the 2nd Century BC.

Maccabees may also refer to:

== Music ==
- The Maccabees (band), English indie rock band
- Maccabeez, an affiliate group of the Wu-Tang-Clan

== Other ==
- Books of the Maccabees, deuterocanonical books
- Holy Maccabees, Christian veneration of a woman and seven sons mentioned in the Books of Maccabees
- Knights of the Maccabees, fraternal organization
- Maccabees Building in Detroit, Michigan
- Yeshiva Maccabees, the athletics program of Yeshiva University in New York, NY

== See also ==
- Maccabi (disambiguation)
- Maccabeus (disambiguation)
- Maccabiah (disambiguation)
- The Maccabaean, early 20th century American magazine
- Maccabaeans
- The Maccabeats, band from Yeshiva University
