= Howard Joffe =

South African tennis player and coach

- Country (sports): South Africa
- Born: October 24, 1971 (age 53); Johannesburg, South Africa

Singles
- Career record: 1–1
- Highest ranking: No. 428 (21 Dec 1992)

Doubles
- Highest ranking: No. 345 (30 Aug 1993)
Medal record
Maccabiah Games
Gold medal – first place	1989 Israel	Men's singles
Silver medal – second place	1989 Israel	Men's doubles

Howard Joffe (born October 24, 1971) is a South African tennis coach and former professional player.

== Playing career ==
Born and raised in Johannesburg, Joffe ranked as high as second nationally as a junior.

He was a singles gold medalist at the 1989 Maccabiah Games in Israel, defeating Israel's Shahar Perkiss, 6-4, 6-4, and a silver medalist in men's doubles.

From 1990 to 1992 he played collegiate tennis for Pepperdine University, earning All-American honors his final year after making the NCAA semi-finals. In 1995 he qualified for his only ATP Tour career main draw at the South African Open and won his first round match over David Nainkin, before losing in the next round to Jörn Renzenbrink. He had a best singles ranking of 428 in the world.

== Tennis coach ==
Joffe has been a collegiate women's head coach since 2008, starting with two seasons at Miami University. He next coached the University of Maryland (2010-11) and Texas A&M (2012-15). His time with Texas A&M included a runner-up finish in the 2013 NCAA championships. In 2016 he became head coach of the University of Texas and he was named Big 12 Conference Coach of the Year in 2018. He coached Texas to back to back Big 12 regular-season championships in 2018 and 2019, then in 2021 guided the Longhorns to the NCAA championship title.
