= 1986 Boston Marathon =

Footrace in Boston, Massachusetts, USA

- Venue: Boston, United States
- Dates: April 21

Champions
- Men: Robert de Castella (2:07:51)
- Women: Ingrid Kristiansen (2:24:55)
- Wheelchair men: André Viger (1:43:25)
- Wheelchair women: Candace Cable (2:09:28)

The 1986 Boston Marathon was the 90th running of the annual marathon race in Boston, United States, which was held on April 21. The elite men's race was won by Australia's Robert de Castella in a time of 2:07:51 hours and the women's race was won by Norway's Ingrid Kristiansen in 2:24:55. In the wheelchair race, André Viger of Canada won the men's race in 1:43:25 and Candace Cable of United States won the women's race in 2:09:28. A men's visually impaired race was hosted within the marathon for the first time, and was won by an American Ricardo Pacheco in a time of 3:35:15.

A total of 3750 runners finished the race, 3294 men and 456 women.

== Results ==
=== Men ===
Position	Athlete	Nationality	Time
1st place, gold medalist(s)	Robert de Castella	Australia	2:07:51
2nd place, silver medalist(s)	Art Boileau	Canada	2:11:15
3rd place, bronze medalist(s)	Orlando Pizzolato	Italy	2:11:43
4	Bill Rodgers	United States	2:13:36
5	Arturo Barrios	Mexico	2:14:09
6	Bob Hodge	United States	2:14:50
7	Domingo Tibaduiza	Colombia	2:15:22
8	Paul Cummings	United States	2:16:05
9	Dan Schlesinger	United States	2:16:29
10	Kunimitsu Itō	Japan	2:17:02
11	Pertti Tiainen	Finland	2:17:04
12	Greg Meyer	United States	2:17:29
13	Hiroshi Nagashima	Japan	2:17:38
14	Gonzalo Huggins	Venezuela	2:18:11
15	Robert Doyle	United States	2:19:03
16	Michael Hurd	United Kingdom	2:19:04
17	Trevor Fieldsend	United Kingdom	2:19:19
18	Michael Patterson	United States	2:21:14
19	Kjeld Johnsen	Denmark	2:21:19
20	Neil Cusack	Ireland	2:21:24
21	Seppo Liuttu	Finland	2:22:12
22	Paul McGovern	United States	2:22:18
23	Mark Bossardet	United States	2:22:29
24	Peter Kanfer	United States	2:22:42
25	Roger Luis Lopez	Costa Rica	2:22:42

=== Women ===
Position	Athlete	Nationality	Time
1st place, gold medalist(s)	Ingrid Kristiansen	Norway	2:24:55
2nd place, silver medalist(s)	Carla Beurskens	Netherlands	2:27:35
3rd place, bronze medalist(s)	Lizanne Bussières	Canada	2:32:16
4	Evy Palm	Sweden	2:32:47
5	Sinikka Keskitalo	Finland	2:33:18
6	Julie Isphording	United States	2:33:40
7	Christa Vahlensieck	West Germany	2:34:50
8	Lorraine Moller	New Zealand	2:35:06
9	Eileen Claugus	United States	2:38:23
10	Ellen Rochefort	Canada	2:40:00
11	Hazel Stewart	New Zealand	2:41:12
12	Mary Hynes	United States	2:41:50
13	Sissel Grottenberg	Norway	2:43:00
14	Bobbi Rothman	United States	2:43:36
15	Audrey Kemp	United States	2:46:52
16	Ena Guevara	Peru	2:47:37
17	Oonagh Bruni	United States	2:49:22
18	Gina Sperry	United States	2:49:34
19	Margaret Ballantyne	United States	2:50:30
20	Doreen Mastalli	United States	2:51:24
21	Beth Dillinger	United States	2:51:26
22	Nancy Munroe	United States	2:51:51
23	Marty Anderson	United States	2:53:19
24	Patricia Sher	United States	2:54:11
25	Sima Dianat	United States	2:54:22

=== Wheelchair men ===
Position	Athlete	Nationality	Time
1st place, gold medalist(s)	André Viger	Canada	1:43:25
2nd place, silver medalist(s)	George Murray	United States	1:48:59
3rd place, bronze medalist(s)	Laverne Achenbach	United States	1:51:25
4	Ted Vince	Canada	1:51:26
5	Junior Rice	United States	1:53:19
6	Bosse Lindquist	Sweden	1:55:03
7	Kenneth Archer	United States	1:55:19
8	Philippe Couprie	France	1:55:54
9	Joe Ray	United States	1:56:59
10	Phil Carpenter	United States	1:57:03

=== Wheelchair women ===
Position	Athlete	Nationality	Time
1st place, gold medalist(s)	Candace Cable	United States	2:09:28
