= Maccabi =

A Maccabi or Maccabee (Hebrew: מכבי) is one of the Maccabees, a group of Jewish rebel warriors who controlled Judea.

Maccabi or Maccabee may also refer to:

== People ==
- Bruce Maccabee, an American optical physicist
- Judas Maccabeus or Judah Maccabee, leader of the Maccabean Revolt

== Other ==
- Maccabi (sports) (or Maccabi World Union), international Jewish sports association
  - List of Maccabi sports clubs and organisations
- Maccabi Sherutei Briut, an Israeli Health Maintenance Organization
- Maccabi youth movement, a Zionist youth movement established in 1929
- Maccabim-Re'ut, a former local council in central Israel
- Operation Maccabi, a 1948 military operation
- Maccabee (beer), produced by Tempo Beer Industries
- The Maccabees, a British indie rock band

== See also ==
- Maccabees (disambiguation)
- Maccabeus (disambiguation)
- Maccabiah (disambiguation)
