= Sasha Gollish =

Canadian runner (born 1981)

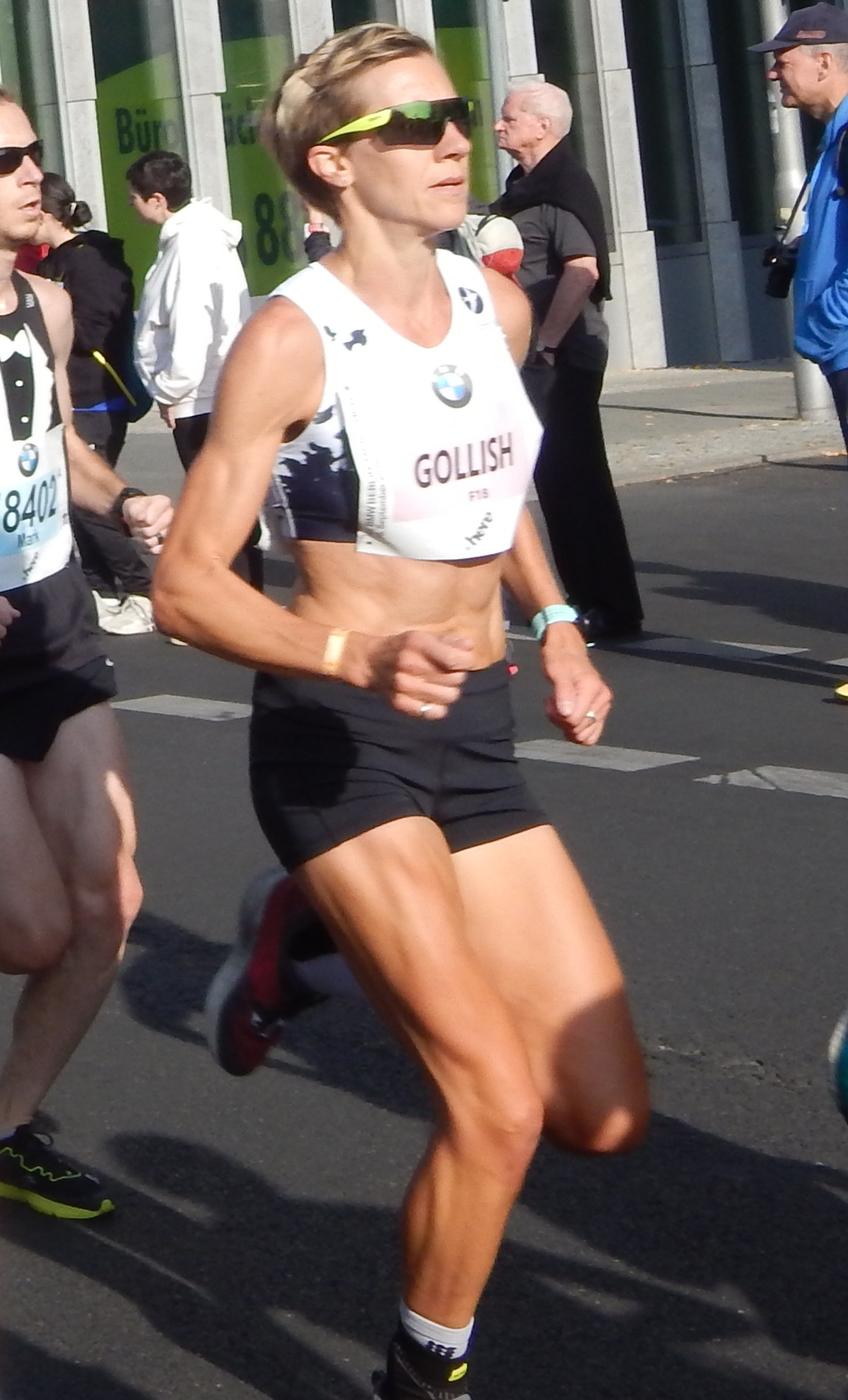
- Gollish at the 2018 Berlin Marathon

Personal information
- National team: Canada
- Born: 27 December 1981 (age 44) Toronto, Ontario, Canada
- Education: Bachelor of Engineering (University of Western Ontario); B.A. in Economics, Masters of Engineering, and PhD in Civil Engineering Education (University of Toronto).
- Height: 165 cm (5 ft 5 in)
- Weight: 48 kg (106 lb)
- Website: www.sashagollish.com

Sport
- Sport: Running
- University team: University of Toronto Varsity Blues
- Club: Royal City Athletics Club
- Coached by: Terry Radchenko

Achievements and titles
- Regional finals: 2017 women's 8K NACAC Cross-Country Champion; 2022 women's Half Marathon NACAC Champion
- National finals: 2016 Canadian women's 10K Cross Country National Champion; 2018 Canadian women's Half Marathon National Champion
- Highest world ranking: World record in women’s 40+ indoor mile (2022)
- Personal bests: 600m 1:36.52 (2011); 600m ind. 1:29.71 (2015); 800m 2:02.90 (2015); 1000m ind. 2:40.99 (2017); 1500m 4:07.08 (2015); 1500m ind. 4:18.75 (2015); Mile 4:32.17 (2021); Mile ind. 4:38.73 (2022); 3000m 9:00.42 (2016); 3000m ind. 9:11.09 (2017); 5000m 15:24.12 (2017); 10000m 32:56.89 (2022); 3000mSC 11:10.74 (2002); 5 km Road 16:10 (2016); 10 km 33:03 (2022); Half Marathon 1:11:05 (2016); Marathon 2:31:40 (2022); 4x800m ind. 8:32.36 (2015)
Medal record
Women's Athletics
Representing Canada
Maccabiah Games
Gold medal – first place	Jerusalem 2013	Half-marathon
Gold medal – first place	Jerusalem 2017	800m
Gold medal – first place	Jerusalem 2017	1,500m
Gold medal – first place	Jerusalem 2017	5,000m
Pan American Games
Bronze medal – third place	Toronto 2015	Women's 1500m
- Updated on 5 July 2017

Sasha Gollish (born 27 December 1981) is a Canadian competitive runner. She won a gold medal in the half-marathon at the 2013 Maccabiah Games in Israel, a bronze medal in the 1500 m at the 2015 Pan American Games, and gold medals at the 2017 Maccabiah Games in the 800m, 1,500m, and 5,000m events. She won the 2016 Canadian women's 10K Cross Country Championship, the 2017 women's 8K North American, Central American and Caribbean Athletic Association (NACAC) Cross-Country Championship, and the 2018 Canadian Half Marathon National Championship. In 2022, Gollish set a new women’s 40+ indoor mile world record, and that same year she won the gold medal at the 2022 NACAC Half Marathon Championships.

== Early and personal life ==
Gollish was born in Toronto, Ontario, Canada, to Dr. Jeffrey Gollish and Dr. Patricia Houston. She has two younger siblings, Tara and Joey.

For high school, Gollish attended York Mills Collegiate Institute. She has a B.A. in Economics (University of Toronto), a Bachelor of Engineering (University of Western Ontario), a Master of Engineering (U of T), and a PhD in Civil Engineering Education (U of T), in studying which she researched the best way to teach engineering students to use math.

She works as an engineering consultant. Gollish is a civil engineer, with a focus on road safety. She is also a competitive cyclist, duathlete, triathlete, and ultimate frisbee player.

== Running career ==
=== 2010-15 ===
Gollish began running seriously at 30 years of age. She has run for the University of Toronto Varsity Blues.

She won the half-marathon at the 2013 Maccabiah Games. Gollish won the 2013 Sporting Life 10K in Toronto with a time of 35:58.

Gollish finished fifth in the 1500m at the 2014 Canadian Track and Field Championships. She won the Sporting Life 10K in Toronto with a time of 34:19.

At the 2015 Pan American Games, competing for Team Canada, Gollish won a bronze medal in the Women's 1500m with a time of 4:10.11. She was named 2015 Canadian Interuniversity Sport (CIS) Female Athlete of the Year (track events) for her performance at the CIS Championships, winning three gold medals in the 1000m, 3000m, and 4 × 800 m relay events and two silver medals in the 600m and 1500m events, the most individual medals ever won by a distance athlete. She was also named MVP of the 2015 Ontario University Athletics (OUA) Championships after winning three individual gold medals in the 600m, 1500m, and 3000m events. In November 2015 she was named one of the Top 8 Academic All-Canadians by Canadian Interuniversity Sport. In December 2015 she won the silver medal in the San Antonio Rock ‘n Roll Half Marathon.

=== 2016-20 ===
In March 2016, Gollish won a silver medal in the senior 10K with a 37:53 run at the 2016 Pan American Cross Country Cup. In November 2016 she won the CNO Financial Indianapolis Monumental Half-Marathon with a time of 1:11:07, setting a new course record. Later that month Gollish won the senior women's 10K at the Canadian Cross Country Championships in Kingston, Ontario, at Fort Henry.

In March 2017, Gollish won the senior women's 8K with a time of 26:48 at the North America, Central America and Caribbean Athletic Association (NACAC) Cross-Country Championships in Boca Raton, Florida. In June 2017 she won the women's 5000m in 15:24.12 at the Stumptown Twilight track meet at Lewis & Clark College.

In July 2017 she came in third in the women’s 5,000m at 15:42 at the Canadian Track and Field Championships in Ottawa. In 2017 Gollish also set the Canadian 35+ masters 1,500m record with a time of 4:07.70, and the Canadian 35+ 5000m record with a time of 15:24.12.

Gollish won gold medals in the 800m, 1,500m (in 4:18.41), and 5,000m events at the 2017 Maccabiah Games, and received the Female Athlete of the Games award from Israeli supermodel closing event host Bar Refaeli.

In May 2018, she won the Canadian National Championship in the Half Marathon in Calgary, Canada, with a time of 1:14:19.

On 11 July 2018, Gollish completed the marathon distance in a training run in a respectable 3:18:48. Her debut marathon was in Berlin in September of the same year. Unfortunately, at 31 kilometres she was forced to DNF after the honking of a blocked pace car behind her caused her to go into an anaerobic state, leading to her cramping severely, walking, and then falling. She was dragged off the course in full-body rigour by paramedics and brought to the hospital. After the incident, she said: "I wanted to quit racing. I’m an engineer, I have a Ph.D., why am I doing this?" But after a few days, she realized that she was too in love with running to stop.

=== 2021-present ===
In 2021 Gollish set the W35 Canadian national record in the mile at the age of 39, with a time of 4:23.17.

On 27 February 2022, Gollish set a new women’s 40+ indoor mile world record of 4:38.73, breaking the decade-old record by six seconds, at the Ontario Masters Championships in Toronto.

In June 2022, Gollish broke the previous women’s Canadian 40+ 1,500m record by seven seconds in a time of 4:16.46 at the La Classique d’athlétisme de Montréal. In 2022 she also won two national championship medals, in the 10,000m (silver) and road 10K (bronze), and the gold medal at the 2022 NACAC Half Marathon Championships in San Jose, Costa Rica in mid-May.

In September 2022 she won the women’s vertical climb at the Canadian Mountain & Trail Running Championships in Vernon, British Columbia.

== See also ==
- List of Maccabiah records in athletics
- List of Pan American Games medalists in athletics (women)
