= Mark Handelsman =

Mark Ian Handelsman
Personal information
- Nationality: Israel
- Born: מארק הנדלסמן; June 9, 1961 (age 65) Johannesburg, South Africa

Sport
- Sport: Athletics
- Event: Middle-distance running

Achievements and titles
- Personal best: 800 metres: 1:45.3 minutes (1981)

Mark Ian Handelsman (Hebrew: מארק הנדלסמן; born 9 June 1961) is a retired South African-born Israeli middle distance runner who specialized in the 800 metres.

He was born in Johannesburg, South Africa.

Handelsman was an All-American runner for the USC Trojans track and field team, finishing 7th in the 800 m at the 1983 NCAA Division I Outdoor Track and Field Championships.

Handelsman competed for Israel at the 1983 World Championships but did not progress from the heats. At the 1984 Summer Olympic, he competed in both 400 metres, 800 metres and 1500 metres without reaching the final.

His personal best time for the 800m was 1.45.3 minutes, achieved in April 1981 in Stellenbosch.

== See also ==
- List of Israeli records in athletics
- List of Maccabiah records in athletics
