= List of Maccabiah medalists in athletics (women) =

This is an incomplete list of women's Maccabiah medalists in track & field athletics from 1932 to the present.

== Current Program ==
=== 100 metres ===
Games	Gold	Silver	Bronze
1932 Maccabiah			
1935 Maccabiah			
1950 Maccabiah			
1953 Maccabiah			
1957 Maccabiah			
1961 Maccabiah			
1965 Maccabiah			
1969 Maccabiah			
1973 Maccabiah	Esther Rot (ISR); 11.75 CR		
1977 Maccabiah			
1981 Maccabiah			
1985 Maccabiah			
1989 Maccabiah			
1993 Maccabiah			
1997 Maccabiah			
2001 Maccabiah			
2005 Maccabiah			
2009 Maccabiah			
2013 Maccabiah			
2017 Maccabiah	Diana Vaisman (ISR); 11.71 CR	Ellie Edwards (GBR); 12.17	Danielle Polster (ISR); 12.18

=== 100 metres hurdles ===
Games	Gold	Silver	Bronze
1932 Maccabiah			
1935 Maccabiah			
1950 Maccabiah			
1953 Maccabiah			
1957 Maccabiah			
1961 Maccabiah			
1965 Maccabiah			
1969 Maccabiah			
1973 Maccabiah			
1977 Maccabiah			
1981 Maccabiah			
1985 Maccabiah			
1989 Maccabiah			
1993 Maccabiah			
1997 Maccabiah			
2001 Maccabiah			
2005 Maccabiah			
2009 Maccabiah			
2013 Maccabiah			
2017 Maccabiah			

=== 200 metres ===
Games	Gold	Silver	Bronze
1932 Maccabiah			
1935 Maccabiah			
1950 Maccabiah			
1953 Maccabiah			
1957 Maccabiah			
1961 Maccabiah			
1965 Maccabiah			
1969 Maccabiah			
1973 Maccabiah			
1977 Maccabiah			
1981 Maccabiah			
1985 Maccabiah			
1989 Maccabiah			
1993 Maccabiah			
1997 Maccabiah			
2001 Maccabiah			
2005 Maccabiah			
2009 Maccabiah			
2013 Maccabiah			
2017 Maccabiah			

=== 400 metres ===
Games	Gold	Silver	Bronze
1932 Maccabiah			
1935 Maccabiah			
1950 Maccabiah			
1953 Maccabiah			
1957 Maccabiah			
1961 Maccabiah			
1965 Maccabiah			
1969 Maccabiah			
1973 Maccabiah			
1977 Maccabiah			
1981 Maccabiah			
1985 Maccabiah			
1989 Maccabiah			
1993 Maccabiah			
1997 Maccabiah			
2001 Maccabiah			
2005 Maccabiah			
2009 Maccabiah			
2013 Maccabiah			
2017 Maccabiah			

=== 400 metres hurdles ===
Games	Gold	Silver	Bronze
1932 Maccabiah			
1935 Maccabiah			
1950 Maccabiah			
1953 Maccabiah			
1957 Maccabiah			
1961 Maccabiah			
1965 Maccabiah			
1969 Maccabiah			
1973 Maccabiah			
1977 Maccabiah			
1981 Maccabiah			
1985 Maccabiah			
1989 Maccabiah			
1993 Maccabiah			
1997 Maccabiah			
2001 Maccabiah			
2005 Maccabiah			
2009 Maccabiah			
2013 Maccabiah			
2017 Maccabiah			

=== 800 metres ===
Games	Gold	Silver	Bronze
1932 Maccabiah			
1935 Maccabiah			
1950 Maccabiah			
1953 Maccabiah			
1957 Maccabiah			
1961 Maccabiah			
1965 Maccabiah			
1969 Maccabiah			
1973 Maccabiah			
1977 Maccabiah			
1981 Maccabiah			
1985 Maccabiah			
1989 Maccabiah			
1993 Maccabiah			
1997 Maccabiah			
2001 Maccabiah			
2005 Maccabiah			
2009 Maccabiah			
2013 Maccabiah	Greta Feldman (USA); 2:06.84	Shanie Landen (ISR); 2:07.83	
2017 Maccabiah	Sasha Gollish (CAN); 2:08.87	Rebecca Mehra (USA); 2:08.89	

=== 1500 metres ===
Games	Gold	Silver	Bronze
1932 Maccabiah			
1935 Maccabiah			
1950 Maccabiah			
1953 Maccabiah			
1957 Maccabiah			
1961 Maccabiah			
1965 Maccabiah			
1969 Maccabiah			
1973 Maccabiah			
1977 Maccabiah			
1981 Maccabiah			
1985 Maccabiah			
1989 Maccabiah			
1993 Maccabiah			
1997 Maccabiah			
2001 Maccabiah			
2005 Maccabiah			
2009 Maccabiah			
2013 Maccabiah	Danielle Tauro (USA); 4:24.95	Greta Feldman (USA); 4:25.98	
2017 Maccabiah	Sasha Gollish (CAN); 4:18.81 CR	Rebecca Mehra (USA); 4:21.83	Danielle Katz (USA); 4:27.56

=== 5000 meters ===
Games	Gold	Silver	Bronze
2017 Maccabiah	Sasha Gollish (CAN); 16:22.97 CR	Danielle Katz (USA); 16:33.68	

=== 10K run (road race) ===
Games	Gold	Silver	Bronze
1932 Maccabiah			
1935 Maccabiah			
1950 Maccabiah			
1953 Maccabiah			
1957 Maccabiah			
1961 Maccabiah			
1965 Maccabiah			
1969 Maccabiah			
1973 Maccabiah			
1977 Maccabiah			
1981 Maccabiah			
1985 Maccabiah			
1989 Maccabiah			
1993 Maccabiah			
1997 Maccabiah			
2001 Maccabiah			
2005 Maccabiah			
2009 Maccabiah			
2013 Maccabiah			
2017 Maccabiah	Shayna Rose (USA); 44:33	Jemima Montag (AUS); 45:42	

=== 4×100 metre relay ===
Games	Gold	Silver	Bronze
1932 Maccabiah			
1935 Maccabiah			
1950 Maccabiah			
1953 Maccabiah			
1957 Maccabiah			
1961 Maccabiah			
1965 Maccabiah			
1969 Maccabiah			
1973 Maccabiah			
1977 Maccabiah			
1981 Maccabiah			
1985 Maccabiah			
1989 Maccabiah			
1993 Maccabiah			
1997 Maccabiah			
2001 Maccabiah			
2005 Maccabiah			
2009 Maccabiah			
2013 Maccabiah			
2017 Maccabiah			

=== 4×400 metre relay ===
Games	Gold	Silver	Bronze
1932 Maccabiah			
1935 Maccabiah			
1950 Maccabiah			
1953 Maccabiah			
1957 Maccabiah			
1961 Maccabiah			
1965 Maccabiah			
1969 Maccabiah			
1973 Maccabiah			
1977 Maccabiah			
1981 Maccabiah			
1985 Maccabiah			
1989 Maccabiah			
1993 Maccabiah			
1997 Maccabiah			
2001 Maccabiah			
2005 Maccabiah			
2009 Maccabiah			
2013 Maccabiah			
2017 Maccabiah			

=== Half marathon (excluding masters divisions) ===
Games	Gold	Silver	Bronze
1932 Maccabiah			
1935 Maccabiah			
1950 Maccabiah			
1953 Maccabiah			
1957 Maccabiah			
1961 Maccabiah			
1965 Maccabiah			
1969 Maccabiah			
1973 Maccabiah			
1977 Maccabiah			
1981 Maccabiah	Sarah Strauss (USA); 1:17:37 CR		
1985 Maccabiah			
1989 Maccabiah			
1993 Maccabiah			
1997 Maccabiah			
2001 Maccabiah			
2005 Maccabiah			
2009 Maccabiah			
2013 Maccabiah	Sasha Gollish (CAN); 1:22:39		
2017 Maccabiah	Riki Salem (ISR); 1:29:35	Bridget Blum (USA); 1:30:30	Melissa Perlman (USA); 1:33:47

=== High jump ===
Games	Gold	Silver	Bronze
1932 Maccabiah			
1935 Maccabiah			
1950 Maccabiah			
1953 Maccabiah			
1957 Maccabiah			
1961 Maccabiah			
1965 Maccabiah			
1969 Maccabiah			
1973 Maccabiah			
1977 Maccabiah			
1981 Maccabiah			
1985 Maccabiah			
1989 Maccabiah			
1993 Maccabiah			
1997 Maccabiah			
2001 Maccabiah			
2005 Maccabiah			
2009 Maccabiah			
2013 Maccabiah			
2017 Maccabiah			

=== Pole vault ===
Games	Gold	Silver	Bronze
1932 Maccabiah			
1935 Maccabiah			
1950 Maccabiah			
1953 Maccabiah			
1957 Maccabiah			
1961 Maccabiah			
1965 Maccabiah			
1969 Maccabiah			
1973 Maccabiah			
1977 Maccabiah			
1981 Maccabiah			
1985 Maccabiah			
1989 Maccabiah			
1993 Maccabiah			
1997 Maccabiah			
2001 Maccabiah			
2005 Maccabiah			
2009 Maccabiah			
2013 Maccabiah			
2017 Maccabiah			

=== Long jump ===
Games	Gold	Silver	Bronze
1932 Maccabiah			
1935 Maccabiah			
1950 Maccabiah			
1953 Maccabiah			
1957 Maccabiah			
1961 Maccabiah			
1965 Maccabiah			
1969 Maccabiah			
1973 Maccabiah			
1977 Maccabiah			
1981 Maccabiah	Maya Calé-Benzoor (ISR); 19ft 3in	Iren Shulroof (ISR); 18ft 3in	Sharon Moro (ISR); 17ft 8in
1985 Maccabiah			
1989 Maccabiah			
1993 Maccabiah			
1997 Maccabiah			
2001 Maccabiah			
2005 Maccabiah			
2009 Maccabiah			
2013 Maccabiah			
2017 Maccabiah			

=== Triple jump ===
Games	Gold	Silver	Bronze
1932 Maccabiah			
1935 Maccabiah			
1950 Maccabiah			
1953 Maccabiah			
1957 Maccabiah			
1961 Maccabiah			
1965 Maccabiah			
1969 Maccabiah			
1973 Maccabiah			
1977 Maccabiah			
1981 Maccabiah			
1985 Maccabiah			
1989 Maccabiah			
1993 Maccabiah			
1997 Maccabiah			
2001 Maccabiah			
2005 Maccabiah			
2009 Maccabiah			
2013 Maccabiah			
2017 Maccabiah			

=== Discus throw ===
Games	Gold	Silver	Bronze
1932 Maccabiah			
1935 Maccabiah	Lillian Copeland (USA); 37.38m		
1950 Maccabiah			
1953 Maccabiah			
1957 Maccabiah			
1961 Maccabiah			
1965 Maccabiah			
1969 Maccabiah			
1973 Maccabiah			
1977 Maccabiah			
1981 Maccabiah			
1985 Maccabiah			
1989 Maccabiah			
1993 Maccabiah			
1997 Maccabiah			
2001 Maccabiah			
2005 Maccabiah			
2009 Maccabiah			
2013 Maccabiah			
2017 Maccabiah			

=== Shot put ===
Games	Gold	Silver	Bronze
1932 Maccabiah			
1935 Maccabiah	Lillian Copeland (USA); 12.32m		
1950 Maccabiah			
1953 Maccabiah			
1957 Maccabiah			
1961 Maccabiah			
1965 Maccabiah			
1969 Maccabiah			
1973 Maccabiah			
1977 Maccabiah			
1981 Maccabiah			
1985 Maccabiah			
1989 Maccabiah			
1993 Maccabiah			
1997 Maccabiah			
2001 Maccabiah			
2005 Maccabiah			
2009 Maccabiah			
2013 Maccabiah			
2017 Maccabiah			

=== Javelin throw ===
Games	Gold	Silver	Bronze
1932 Maccabiah	Lillian Copeland (USA); CR		
1935 Maccabiah	Lillian Copeland (USA); 36.92m		
1950 Maccabiah			
1953 Maccabiah			
1957 Maccabiah	Edna Medalia (ISR); 134 ft 3 in CR		
1961 Maccabiah			
1965 Maccabiah			
1969 Maccabiah			
1973 Maccabiah			
1977 Maccabiah			
1981 Maccabiah			
1985 Maccabiah			
1989 Maccabiah			
1993 Maccabiah			
1997 Maccabiah			
2001 Maccabiah			
2005 Maccabiah			
2009 Maccabiah			
2013 Maccabiah			
2017 Maccabiah	Marharyta Dorozhon (ISR); 63.07m		

=== Hammer throw ===
Games	Gold	Silver	Bronze
1932 Maccabiah			
1935 Maccabiah			
1950 Maccabiah			
1953 Maccabiah			
1957 Maccabiah			
1961 Maccabiah			
1965 Maccabiah			
1969 Maccabiah			
1973 Maccabiah			
1977 Maccabiah			
1981 Maccabiah			
1985 Maccabiah			
1989 Maccabiah			
1993 Maccabiah			
1997 Maccabiah			
2001 Maccabiah			
2005 Maccabiah			
2009 Maccabiah			
2013 Maccabiah			
2017 Maccabiah			

== Discontinued events ==
=== 200 meters hurdles ===
Games	Gold	Silver	Bronze
1932 Maccabiah			
1935 Maccabiah			
1950 Maccabiah			
1953 Maccabiah			
1957 Maccabiah<			
1961 Maccabiah			
1965 Maccabiah			
1969 Maccabiah			
1973 Maccabiah			
1977 Maccabiah			
1981 Maccabiah			
1985 Maccabiah			
1989 Maccabiah			
1993 Maccabiah			
1997 Maccabiah			
2001 Maccabiah			
2005 Maccabiah			
2009 Maccabiah			
2013 Maccabiah			

=== 3000 meters ===
Games	Gold	Silver	Bronze
1932 Maccabiah			
1935 Maccabiah			
1950 Maccabiah			
1953 Maccabiah			
1957 Maccabiah			
1961 Maccabiah			
1965 Maccabiah			
1969 Maccabiah			
1973 Maccabiah			
1977 Maccabiah			
1981 Maccabiah	Anat Meiri (ISR); 9:27.81 CR		
1985 Maccabiah			
1989 Maccabiah			
1993 Maccabiah			
1997 Maccabiah			
2001 Maccabiah			
2005 Maccabiah			
2009 Maccabiah			
2013 Maccabiah			

=== 3000 meters race walk ===
Games	Gold	Silver	Bronze
1932 Maccabiah			
1935 Maccabiah			
1950 Maccabiah			
1953 Maccabiah			
1957 Maccabiah			
1961 Maccabiah			
1965 Maccabiah			
1969 Maccabiah			
1973 Maccabiah			
1977 Maccabiah			
1981 Maccabiah			
1985 Maccabiah			
1989 Maccabiah			
1993 Maccabiah			
1997 Maccabiah			
2001 Maccabiah			
2005 Maccabiah			
2009 Maccabiah			
2013 Maccabiah			
