= 1985 Maccabiah Games =

12th Maccabiah
- Host city: Tel Aviv, Israel
- Nations: 38
- Debuting countries: Gibraltar; Guam; Panama; Zaire
- Athletes: 3,700
- Torchbearer: Mark Spitz
- Main venue: Ramat Gan Stadium

The 12th Maccabiah Games brought over 4,000 athletes to Israel from 38 nations to compete in 28 sports.

== History ==
The Maccabiah Games were first held in 1932. In 1961, they were declared a "Regional Sports Event" by, and under the auspices and supervision of, the International Olympic Committee. Among other Olympic and world champions, swimmer Mark Spitz won 10 Maccabiah gold medals before earning his first of nine Olympic gold medals.

== Opening ceremonies ==
Twenty years after his first appearance in the Maccabiah, Olympic champion Mark Spitz returned to Israel to carry the Opening Ceremony’s Torch into Ramat Gan Stadium. He was accompanied by Shirli Shapiro, Anok Spitzer, and Shlomit Romano, children of three of the Israelis slain in the Munich Massacre at the 1972 Munich Olympics.

== Notable competitors ==
Seven men's and 14 women's records were broken in swimming, with the U.S. team winning all but three of the gold medals in this category. Twelve new men's records and 7 new women's records were broken in track and field. The U.S. won 109 gold medals, 90 silver medals, and 74 bronze medals, slightly fewer than half of the medals won by all other countries combined.

Canadian Mark Berger, who had won a silver medal at the Olympics the year prior, won a gold medal in judo. Brazilian Márcio Stambowsky won a bronze medal in judo.

James Espir of the United Kingdom won a gold medal in the 1,500 m run. American Ken Flax won the gold medal in the hammer throw. Canadian Gordon Orlikow, who later was a bronze medalist in the decathlon at the Pan American Games, won the gold medal in the men's decathlon with 7,141 points (finishing in first place in the 110 m hurdles and 1,500 m run, and in second place in the 400 m run, the long jump, discus, javelin, and shot put), and broke the Maccabiah Games record in the 100-meter hurdles at 14.73 seconds, earning a second gold medal.

American Donna Orender played for, was the oldest player on, and was captain of the Team USA women's basketball team.

Robbie Weingard played basketball for Team USA, helping it win a gold medal. Israeli Ari Rosenberg won a silver medal in basketball with Team Israel.

American Ronni Reis won the gold medal, and American Jamie Golder won the silver medal, in the women's singles tennis event. Shawn Lipman represented South Africa in rugby union, winning a gold medal.

American soccer future Hall of Famer Jeff Agoos and Seth Roland competed in soccer for the United States, which came in 6th. Nir Levine competed for Israel, which won the gold medal.

A Junior Maccabiah was held for the first time.

== Participating communities ==
Thirty-eight nations sent delegations. The number in parentheses indicates the number of participants that community contributed.

- Argentina
- Australia
- Austria
- Belgium
- Bermuda
- Brazil
- Canada
- Chile
- Colombia
- Denmark
- Ecuador
- Finland
- France
- West Germany
- Gibraltar
- Guam
- India
- Israel
- Italy
- Japan
- Mexico
- Netherlands
- Norway
- Panama
- Peru
- Puerto Rico
- South Africa
- Sweden
- Switzerland
- Turkey
- United Kingdom
- United States
- Uruguay
- Venezuela
- Virgin Islands
- Yugoslavia
- Zaire
