= Ken Flax =

American hammer thrower (born 1963)

Personal information
- Born: April 20, 1963 (age 63) San Francisco, California, United States

Sport
- Sport: Track and field
Medal record
Representing United States
Summer Universiade
Gold medal – first place	1991 Sheffield	Hammer throw
Bronze medal – third place	1989 Duisburg	Hammer throw

Kenneth Flax (born April 20, 1963) is a retired American Olympic hammer thrower, whose personal best throw is 80.02 metres, achieved in May 1988 in Modesto.

Flax was born in San Francisco, California, and is Jewish. Flax is a two-time Olympic hammer thrower, who competed in the 1988 and 1992 Olympic Games. He competed in Track & Field as a student at Redwood High School, and began throwing the hammer for the University of Oregon in January 1982, and by June 1982 he won the USA Junior National Championships and competed in the Junior Pan Am Games in Caracas, Venezuela. Flax later went on to win two Pac-10 championships and the 1986 NCAA Championships, throwing seven personal records in nine throws and broke the NCAA record three times in the process which still stands today as the American Collegiate Record.

After college, Flax went on to compete in three World University Games winning a bronze and in 1991 he won the gold medal, beating the former number one ranked hammer thrower in the world, Heinz Weis. One of the highlights of Flax's throwing career was competing in the 1987 and 1991 World Championships, where he finished 7th in 1991 marking the first time in 21 years that an American has made the finals in the hammer throw in a non-boycotted major world event.

Flax won the gold medal in the hammer throw at both the 1985 Maccabiah Games, and then at the 1989 Maccabiah Games with a 78.86 meter toss.

Flax was inducted into the Redwood High School Athletic Hall of Fame, and the University of Oregon Athletic Hall of Fame.

== Achievements ==
Year	Competition	Venue	Position	Notes
Representing the United States
1985	Maccabiah Games	Ramat Gan, Israel	1st	68.34 m
1986	Goodwill Games	Moscow, Soviet Union	10th	73.44 m
1987	World Championships	Rome, Italy	20th	73.36 m
1988	Olympic Games	Seoul, South Korea	18th	72.70 m
1989	Maccabiah Games	Ramat Gan, Israel	1st	78.06 m
1989	Summer Universiade	Duisburg, West Germany	3rd	75.86 m
1991	World Championships	Tokyo, Japan	7th	75.98 m
1991	Summer Universiade	Sheffield, England	1st	76.46 m
1992	Olympic Games	Barcelona, Spain	23rd	69.36 m

== See also ==
- List of Maccabiah records in athletics
