= 1989 Maccabiah Games =

13th Maccabiah
- Host city: Tel Aviv, Israel
- Nations: 45
- Athletes: 4,400
- Torchbearer: Hanoch Budin
- Main venue: Ramat Gan Stadium

The 13th Maccabiah Games brought 4,500 athletes to Israel from 45 nations.

Jewish athletes from Hungary participated for the first time since World War II, Jewish athletes from Russia had been permitted, by their country, to play for the first time.

Lithuania competed in first and second games, but had to stop because of occupation by Soviet Union. In 1989 Lithuania reentered the games and it was the first time after occupation when athletes from Lithuania participated under Lithuanian flag in competition recognized by IOC.

== History ==
The Maccabiah Games are named after the Jewish warrior Judah Maccabee, who in 167 B.C. defeated Roman armies that invaded Israel.

The Maccabiah Games were first held in 1932. World War II forced the games to be postponed between 1938-50. In 1961, they were declared a "Regional Sports Event" by, and under the auspices and supervision of, the International Olympic Committee. Among other Olympic and world champions, swimmer Mark Spitz won 10 Maccabiah gold medals before earning his first of nine Olympic gold medals.

== Notable competitors ==
In track and field, American Olympian Ken Flax won the gold medal in the hammer throw with a 78.86 meter toss. Israeli Rogel Nachum, future 3-time Olympian, won a gold medal in the triple jump.

In swimming, American Olympian and world champion Joanna Zeiger competed and won a gold medal, a silver medal, and two bronze medals. Belgian Olympic swimmer Sidney Appelboom won a gold medal in the 200 m breaststroke. Brazilian Olympic swimmer Patrícia Amorim won both the 400 m and 800 m freestyle gold medals. Eran Groumi competed for Israel in swimming, winning the 100 m and 200 m butterfly. Olympian Marlene Bruten won a silver medal in the 200 m butterfly. Hungarian Olympic swimmer Tamás Deutsch and American swimmer John Witchel also competed in swimming, winning a silver medal in the 200 m freestyle. American Olympian rower Sherry Cassuto won the single sculls crew event.

In tennis, Israeli Ilana Berger defeated American Andrea Berger (who won a gold medal herself, in women's doubles) to win the gold medal in women's singles. South African Howard Joffe, part of the ROW (Rest of the World) team due to country sanctions, won the gold medal in men's singles in tennis (and a silver medal in men's doubles), defeating silver medalist Shahar Perkiss of Israel (who won a gold medal in men's doubles with Boaz Merenstein). American Dan Goldberg won two bronze medals in tennis, in the men's and mixed doubles. In addition, Doug Eisenman competed for the United States in tennis.

In gymnastics, Israeli future Olympian Ron Kaplan won a gold medal in the individual all-around competition, at 19 years of age. Brazilian Olympian Alan Adler won a gold medal in the yacht laser event. In rowing, American Olympian Sherry Cassuto won the single sculls crew event, which was a new event.

Israelis Lior Arditti and Nadav Henefeld (who was voted the MVP in basketball) won gold medals with the Israeli basketball team, as the Israeli basketball team won for the first time in 16 years. Basketball player Jerry Simon, who later made aliyah and played professionally in Israel, won a silver medal with Team USA, which was coached by Ben Braun.

Chris O'Loughlin won a silver medal in epee, and a bronze medal in team epee, in fencing for the United States. Shawn Lipman represented the United States in rugby union, and was selected as MVP of the Rugby Event, as the team won a bronze medal. American squash player Stephen L. Green competed, but could not repeat his 1985 bronze medal performance. In wrestling, Canadian future Olympian Andrew Borodow won two gold medals.

American future Hall of Famer Jeff Agoos and Seth Roland competed in soccer for the United States. Argentine soccer player Esteban Becker won a silver medal.

== Closing ceremony ==
The closing ceremony was held at the Western Wall in Jerusalem for the first time.

== Participating Jewish communities ==
Forty-five nations sent delegations. Israel won 258 medals (97 gold), and the USA won 199 medals (74 gold). Canada came in third with 67 medals (15 gold), and Hungary won 15 medals (4 gold).

- Argentina
- Australia
- Austria
- Belgium
- Bermuda
- Bolivia
- Canada (148 athletes)
- Chile
- Colombia
- Costa Rica
- Denmark
- Finland
- France
- West Germany
- Gibraltar
- Greece
- Guatemala
- Hong Kong
- Hungary
- India
- Ireland
- Israel
- Italy
- Japan
- Lithuania
- Mexico
- Netherlands
- New Zealand
- Norway
- Panama
- Peru
- Puerto Rico
- Singapore
- Spain
- South Africa
- Sweden
- Switzerland
- South Korea
- Soviet Union
- United Kingdom
- United States
- Uruguay
- Venezuela
- Yugoslavia
- Zaire

== Link ==
- Summaries of each of the Games
