= Maccabiah sports =

Maccabiah sports are official sports contested at the Maccabiah by the International Maccabiah Committee (IMC). Recent Maccabiah games included over 40 different sports.

== Structure ==
Within the Maccabiah, four separate competitions take place: Junior, Masters, Open, and Paralympics. Junior games are open to any qualifying athlete of age 15 to 18 (depending on the event, as young as 13 years old might be able to qualify). The Masters games are designed for the older athletes from each deletion. Within the Masters games there are separate age classes. The open division is intended for the best athletes from each delegation and as such subject to the rules of the international governing body of that sport.

The Maccabiah also hosts a paralympics division which hosts various paralympic and wheelchair sports. The paralympic swimming competitions at the Maccabiah cover all swimming stroke in the 50-meter and 100-meter events. The Maccabiah typically hosts a para table tennis competition which includes both paralympic standing and a paralympic wheelchair category. The Maccabiah also hosts other events such as the para-cycling, wheelchair basketball, and paralympics half marathon.

== Overview ==
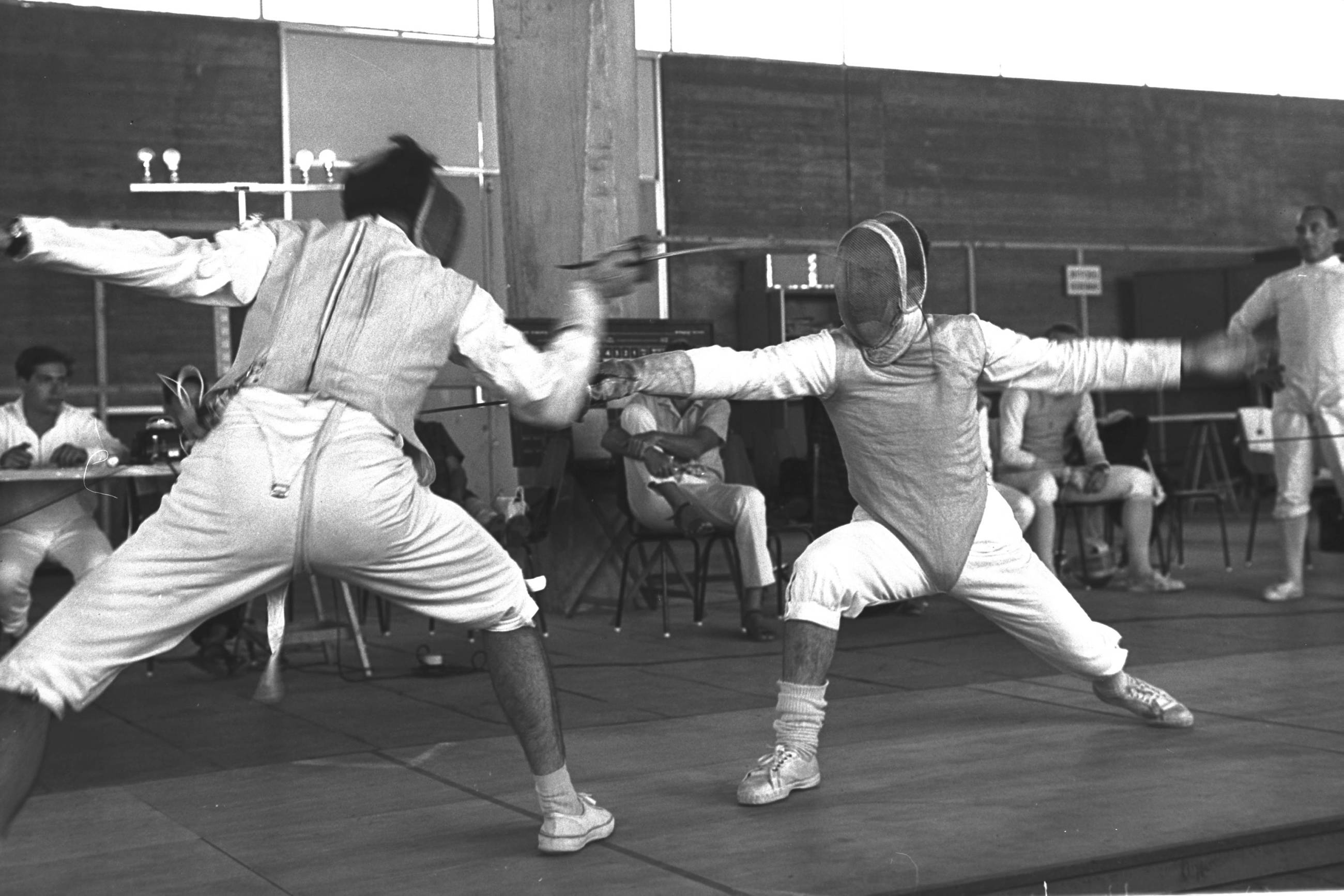
A Fencing match between an Israeli and a Dutch opponent during the 7th Maccabiah.

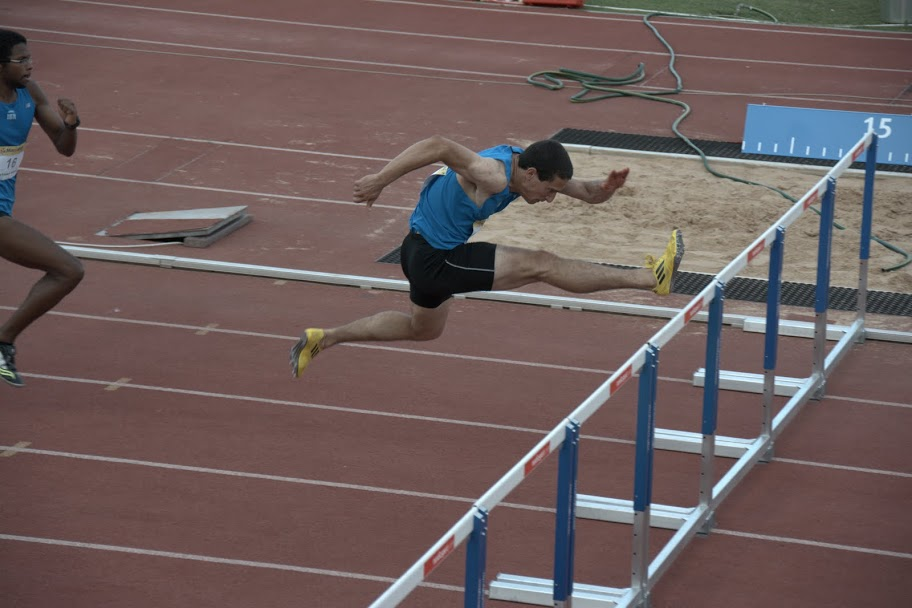
Tomer Almogi (Israeli hurdler) at the 110-meter Men's Hurdles finals.

=== Swimming ===
Swimming has been part of the Maccabiah since the first Maccabiah in 1932. Additionally, the Maccabiah games include open water competitions of 1,500 and 5,000 meters. Swimming competitions are conducted according to the rules of the International Swimming Federation (FINA).

=== Squash ===
Squash became an official sport in the 10th Maccabiah Games in 1977. The competition was held at the Hebrew University of Jerusalem, which had two courts that were covered by a tin roof and open to the air. That year, the United States team consisted of the top Jewish hardball squash players in the country. The team was led by Glenn Whitman, former captain and number one player at Harvard University. Other players included Len Bernheimer, a top ranked amateur who previously played in college at Williams, Roger Alcaly, and Bill Kaplan, captain of Harvard's varsity squash team.

=== Ice hockey ===
Ice hockey entered the Maccabiah in 1997 with Canada winning the gold medal. The United States team was able to secure a silver place position. Ice hockey was not included in subsequent games but returned in 2013 as part of the 19th Maccabiah. The countries represented in three divisions were Canada, Israel, Russia, Ukraine and the USA. Canada won the Gold Medal in the Open Division after crushing USA 7-1. Canada also won the Gold Medal in the Juniors Division defeating USA 3-2. USA, however got some payback in the Masters Division as they defeated Canada 7-4, winning USA's first ever Gold Medal in Maccabiah Ice Hockey history.

=== Chess ===
Chess has been recognized as a sport and was included in the 2nd Maccabiah. During the 50s and 60s chess disappeared from the games. Chess was renewed at the 10th Maccabiah in 1977 and has grown considerably ever since. In the 17th Maccabiah, a Super-Tournament took place.

== Maccabiah programs ==
A check (✔) denotes the program took place in that edition of the Maccabiah. An X mark (✘) denotes the games were not available for that specified edition of the Maccabiah. A bullet (•) denotes the program was available, however for one or more reasons the competition did not take place (typically due to insufficient amount of delegations).

Sport (Discipline)	1st	2nd	3rd	4th	5th	6th	7th	8th	9th	10th	11th	12th	13th	14th	15th	16th	17th	18th	19th	20th	21st
Current programs
Archery	?	?	?	?	?	?	?	?	?	?	?	?	?	?	?	?	?	?	✔		
Badminton	✘	✘	✘	✘	✘	✘	✘	✘	✘	✔	✔	✔	✔	✔	✔	✔	✔	✔	✔	✔	✔
Baseball	?	?	?	?	?	?	?	?	?	?	?	?	?	?	?	?	?	?	✔		
Basketball	?	?	?	?	?	?	?	?	?	?	?	?	?	?	?	?	?	?	✔		
Beach volleyball	✘	✔	✔	✔	✔	✔	✔	✔	✔	✔	✔	✔	✔	✔	✔	✔	✔	✔	✔		
Bridge	✘	✘	✘	✘	✘	✘	✘	✘	✘	✔	✔	✔	?	?	?	?	?	?	✔		
Chess	✘	✔	✘	✘	✘	✘	✘	✘	✘	✔	✔	✔	✔	✔	✔	✔	✔	✔	✔		
Cricket	?	?	?	?	?	?	?	?	?	?	?	?	?	?	?	?	?	?	✔		
Cycling	?	?	?	?	?	?	?	?	?	?	?	?	?	?	?	?	?	?	✔		
Equestrian	?	?	?	?	?	?	?	?	?	?	?	?	?	?	?	?	?	?	✔		
Fencing	?	?	?	?	?	?	✔	✔	✔	✔	✔	✔	✔	✔	✔	✔	✔	✔	✔		
Field Hockey	?	?	?	?	?	?	?	?	?	?	?	?	?	?	?	?	?	?	✔		
Football	?	?	?	?	?	?	?	?	?	?	?	?	?	?	?	?	?	?	✔		
Futsal	?	?	?	?	?	?	?	?	?	?	?	?	?	?	?	?	?	?	✔		
Golf	✘	✘	✘	✘	✘	✘	✔	✔	✔	✔	✔	✔	✔	✔	✔	✔	✔	✔	✔		
Gymnastics	?	?	?	?	?	?	?	?	?	?	?	?	?	?	?	?	?	?	✔		
Half Marathon	?	?	?	?	?	?	?	?	?	?	?	?	?	?	?	?	?	?	✔		
Handball	?	?	?	?	?	?	?	?	?	?	?	?	?	?	?	?	?	?	✔		
Ice hockey	✘	✘	✘	✘	✘	✘	✘	✘	✘	✘	✘	✘	✘	✘	✔	✘	✘	✘	✔		
Judo	✘	✔	✔	✔	✔	✔	✔	✔	✔	✔	✔	✔	✔	✔	✔	✔	✔	✔	✔		
Karate	?	?	?	?	?	?	?	?	?	?	?	?	?	?	?	?	?	?	✔		
Lawn Bowls	✘	✘	✘	✘	✘	✘	✔	✔	✔	✔	✔	✔	✔	✔	✔	✔	✔	✔	✔		
Netball	?	?	?	?	?	?	?	?	?	?	?	?	?	?	?	?	?	?	✔		
Open Water	✔	✔	✔	✔	✔	✔	✔	✔	✔	✔	✔	✔	✔	✔	✔	✔	✔	✔	✔		
Rhythmic gymnastics	?	?	?	?	?	?	?	?	?	?	?	?	?	?	?	?	?	?	✔		
Rowing	✘	✔	✔	✔	✔	✔	✔	✔	✔	✔	✔	✔	✔	✔	✔	✔	✔	✔	✔		
Rugby	?	?	?	?	?	?	?	?	?	?	?	?	?	?	?	?	?	?	✔		
Shooting	✘	✘	✘	✘	✘	✘	✔	✔	✔	✔	✔	✔	✔	✔	✔	✔	✔	✔	✔		
Sailing	✘	✘	✘	✘	✘	✘	✘	✘	✘	✘	✔	?	?	?	?	?	?	?	•		
Softball	✘	✘	✘	✘	✘	✘	✘	✘	✘	✘	✔	✔	✔	✔	✔	✔	✔	✔	✔		
Squash	✘	✘	✘	✘	✘	✘	✘	✘	✘	✔	✔	✔	✔	✔	✔	✔	✔	✔	✔		
Swimming	✔	✔	✔	✔	✔	✔	✔	✔	✔	✔	✔	✔	✔	✔	✔	✔	✔	✔	✔		
Table tennis	?	?	?	?	?	?	?	?	?	?	?	?	?	?	?	?	?	?	✔		
Taekwondo	?	?	?	?	?	?	?	?	?	?	?	?	?	?	?	?	?	?	✔		
Tennis	?	?	?	?	?	?	?	?	?	?	?	?	?	?	?	?	?	?	✔		
Ten-pin bowling	?	?	?	?	?	?	?	?	?	?	?	?	?	?	?	?	?	?	✔		
Track and field	✔	✔	✔	✔	✔	✔	✔	✔	✔	✔	✔	✔	✔	✔	✔	✔	✔	✔	✔		
Triathlon	?	?	?	?	?	?	?	?	?	?	?	?	?	?	?	?	?	?	✔		
Volleyball	✘	✔	✔	✔	✔	✔	✔	✔	✔	✔	✔	✔	✔	✔	✔	✔	✔	✔	✔		
Water polo	?	?	?	?	?	?	?	?	?	?	?	?	?	?	?	?	?	?	✔		
Wrestling	?	?	?	?	?	?	?	?	?	?	?	?	?	?	?	?	?	?	✔		
Past programs
Backgammon	?	?	?	?	?	?	?	?	?	✔	✔	✔	✔	✔	✔	?	?	?	✘		
Sumo	?	?	?	?	?	?	?	?	?	?	?	?	?	?	?	?	?	?	?		
Tug of war	✔	?	?	?	?	?	?	?	?	?	?	?	?	?	?	?	?	?	?		
Ultimate Frisbee	?	?	?	?	?	?	?	?	?	?	?	?	?	?	?	?	?	?	?		
Darts	✘	✔	?	?	?	?	?	?	?	?	?	?	?	?	?	?	?	?	?		
Weightlifting	✘	✔	?	?	?	?	?	?	?	?	?	?	?	?	?	?	?	?	?		
Motorcycle Racing	✔	✔	Discontinued at the 2nd Maccabiah																		
Motor Racing	✔	✔	Discontinued at the 2nd Maccabiah																		
