= 1961 Maccabiah Games =

6th Maccabiah
- Host city: Tel Aviv, Israel
- Nations: 27
- Debuting countries: Colombia; Congo-Léopoldville; Guatemala; Uruguay
- Athletes: 1,100
- Opening: August 29, 1961
- Closing: September 5, 1961
- Opened by: Israeli president Yitzhak Ben-Zvi
- Torchbearer: Yosef Lahav
- Main venue: Ramat Gan Stadium

The 6th Maccabiah Games were held in Tel Aviv, Israel in 1961, with 1,100 athletes from 27 countries competing in 18 sports. The Games were officially opened in an Opening Ceremony on August 29, 1961, in Ramat Gan Stadium by Israeli president Yitzhak Ben-Zvi before a crowd of 30,000. The closing ceremony took place on September 5, 1961, at the stadium before a crowd of 40,000, with Israeli prime minister David Ben Gurion telling the crowd that he hoped that in the future athletes from North Africa, Poland, Hungary, Czechoslovakia, and the Soviet Union would also compete. The United States won 58 gold medals, Israel won 28 gold medals, and South Africa was third with 11 gold medals. American sportscaster Mel Allen narrated a film about the 1961 Games.

== History ==
The Maccabiah Games are held in celebration of the victory of the Jewish Macabees, who defeated Antiochus IV and the Hellenized Syrians in battle in 165 B.C.

The Maccabiah Games were first held in 1932. In 1961, they were declared a "Regional Sports Event" by, and under the auspices and supervision of, the International Olympic Committee.

== Notable competitors ==
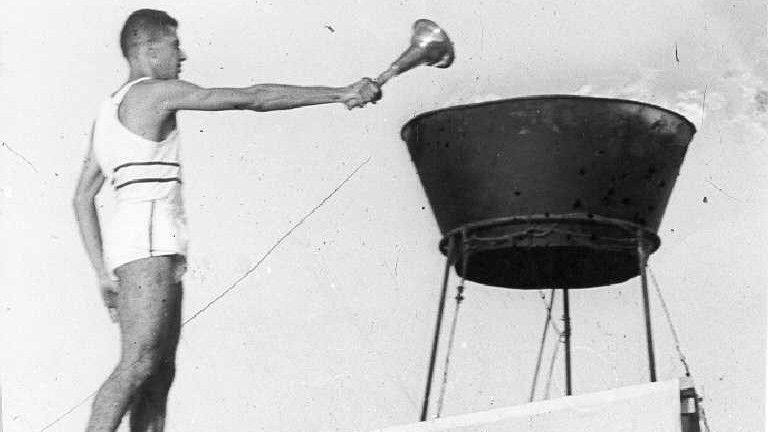
Israeli runner Yosef Lahav lighting the cauldron at the Opening Ceremony.

In swimming, Marilyn Ramenofsky of the US, who three years later was to win a silver medal at the Olympics in the 400-meter freestyle, won a gold medal in the 400-meter freestyle relay, and a bronze in the 400-meter freestyle. She led the US swimming team, which won all but two events. Lindsey Miller-Lerman, later the first Nebraska Supreme Court justice, competed for the U.S. in swimming, winning two gold medals and one silver medal as a teenager.

In fencing, Olympic bronze medal winner Yves Dreyfus of France won the gold medal in épée. American Olympic bronze medalist fencer Al Axelrod, who carried the American flag in the opening ceremony, won a gold medal in foil. Canada's future Olympian Peter Bakonyi won a silver medal.

Larry Brown (later a 3-time American Basketball Association All Star), along with Art Heyman (later the first overall pick in the first round of the 1963 NBA draft) and Charley Rosen, led the United States basketball team to a gold medal. The Israeli team won the silver medal in basketball, with Abraham Gutt on the team.

Gary Gubner of the United States, a future Olympian and world champion, won gold medals in heavyweight weightlifting, shotput, and discus. Gubner won the shot put with a 60 feet 1 1/4 inches (18.320 meters) throw.

In tennis, American former Wimbledon champion Dick Savitt won both the singles gold medal (defeating American Mike Franks in the final), and doubles gold medal (with Franks, defeating South Africans Rod Mandelstam and Julie Mayers). Canadian Vicki Berner won medals in tennis in singles and doubles. South Africans Rod Mandelstam and Marlene Gerson won the mixed doubles gold medal; Gerson also won a gold medal in women's doubles. American Sidney Schwartz competed in men's tennis singles, where he was defeated in the third round by Israeli Elazar Davidman.

Australian Eva Duldig won a gold medal in tennis in women's singles, defeating South African Marlene Gerson in the final, and won a silver medal in women's doubles. Duldig met Dutch Maccabiah tennis player Henri de Jong on a Tel Aviv tennis court at the 1961 Maccabiah Games. They became engaged five days after they met, and married in February 1962. Thereafter, they were married for 57 years, until his death in 2019.

In track and field, Canadian Olympian Stan Levenson won the 100 m sprint. Olympic bronze medalist Dave Segal of Great Britain won the 200 m race, and won a gold medal in the 1600 m relay. American Olympian Elliott Denman won the 3,000 m racewalk. American Gary Gubner won a gold medal in discus. Judy Shapiro won a bronze medal for the U.S. in the 800 m run. Israeli Olympian Ayala Hetzroni won the women's shotput gold medal. Gene Zubrinsky won a silver medal for the U.S. in the high jump.

In swimming, American Jane Katz won the 100 m butterfly, and won a gold medal in the 400 m relay. In wrestling, Canadian future Olympian Phil Oberlander won a gold medal in the middleweight class of Greco-Roman.

American future Olympic gymnast Ron Barak won eight gold medals (including two in the rings and two in the high bar), one silver medal, and one bronze medal. Angelica Rozeanu of Israel, who in her career won 17 world titles, was the women's table tennis singles champion. Allen Rosenberg and future Olympian and world champion Donald Spero of the US won gold medals in rowing.

== Participating communities ==
The United States won 58 gold medals, Israel won 28 gold medals, and South Africa was third with 11 gold medals. First-time participants in 1961 included Colombia, Guatemala, Uruguay, and Congo-Kinshasa.

- Argentina
- Australia
- Austria
- Belgium
- Brazil
- Canada (35)
- Chile
- Colombia
- Congo-Léopoldville
- Denmark
- Finland
- France
- Guatemala
- India
- Ireland
- Israel
- Italy
- Katanga
- Mexico
- Netherlands
- Rhodesia
- South Africa
- Sweden
- Switzerland
- Turkey
- United Kingdom
- United States (135 athletes)
- Uruguay

== U.S. participation ==
135 athletes from the United States participated in the 6th Maccabiah, as well as 9 coaches, 6 managers, 3 doctors, and 2 trainers. The team was sponsored by the United States Committee Sports for Israel, Inc.

=== Medals by sport ===
Sport	Gold	Silver	Bronze	Total
Swimming	17	9	5	31
Track and Field	16	11	13	40
Gymnastics	8	1	1	10
Wrestling	7	6	8	21
Weightlifting	5	1	0	6
Shooting	4	2	2	8
Fencing	3	4	2	9
Rowing	3	0	0	3
Tennis	2	1	0	3
Basketball	1	0	0	1
Golf	1	0	0	1
Volleyball	0	1	0	1
Water polo	0	0	1	1
Totals (13 entries)	67	36	32	135

== Link ==
- Summaries of each of the Games
