= James Espir =

English middle-distance runner

Medal record

Men's athletics

Representing Great Britain

Maccabiah Games
Gold medal – first place	1981 Israel	1500 meters
Gold medal – first place	1981 Israel	5000 meters
Gold medal – first place	1985 Israel	1500 meters

James Espir (born 17 October 1958), is an English middle-distance runner, whose career spanned the late 1970s and early 1980s. Espir competed for Shaftesbury Harriers Athletics Club and for Great Britain.

== Biography ==
Son of neurologist Michael Lucien Ernest Espir (1926–2015) and Patricia (née Smouha), Espir was born into a secular Jewish family with athletic background; his maternal grandfather Edward Smouha won the bronze medal as a member of the Great Britain team in the 4 x 100 metre relay at the 1928 Summer Olympics. Espir's uncle Brian Smouha ran for Great Britain at sprint distances in the early 1960s, and his paternal grandfather Louis Espir ran a four-and-a-half minute mile in 1913.

Espir was educated at Harrow School where he excelled at running. His talent attracted the attention of Harry Wilson, coach to the world's greatest miler at that time, Steve Ovett. Under Wilson's guidance, Espir embarked on a rigorous training schedule with Ovett and other world-class athletes, and competitive success soon followed.

At the age of 18, Espir was the UK Junior 3000 metres champion both indoors and outdoors, and had already represented his country at senior international level. As a 21-year-old in 1980, he ran 1500 metres in 3 minutes 38.2 seconds, a time which would have stood as a British record ten years previously. The following year Espir ran a mile in 3 minutes 56.7 seconds, thereby becoming the fastest Jewish miler ever. In the 1981 Maccabiah Games in Tel Aviv, Israel, he won the 1500 metres and 5000 metres Gold Medals on successive days, and two days later set an Israeli All-comers' record at 1500 metres. Espir's winning times in the 1981 Maccabiah 1500 metres and 5000 metres finals remain, as at January 2023, the current Maccabiah Games records for those events.

Espir's subsequent athletics career was frequently interrupted by injury. After one such lay-off he returned to running under a new coach, Alf Wilkins, and went on to retain his Maccabiah Games 1500 metres title in the 1985 Maccabiah Games. After this he retired from top-class athletics to pursue a career in banking.

Espir continued to compete at club level as a member of Shaftesbury Harriers, at distances from 800 metres up to the Marathon. (In 1986, Shaftesbury Harriers amalgamated with Barnet Copthall Ladies Athletics Club to form Shaftesbury Barnet Harriers). Espir completed the 2004 London Marathon at the age of 45 in a time of 2 hours 47 minutes and 3 seconds, despite stumbling in slippery conditions around five miles from the finish and stress-fracturing his hip and four vertebrae of his back.

== Personal bests ==
Distance	Time	Date
1500 metres	3:38.2	1980
Mile run	3:56.7	1981
3000 metres	7:51.92	1980
5000 metres	13:53.49	1981

== See also ==
- List of Maccabiah records in athletics
