= Dan Schlesinger =

American lawyer, artist and athlete

Dan Schlesinger is an American lawyer and artist who was a former long-distance running athlete. He was the third-place finisher at the 1982 New York City Marathon and was in the top 10 finishers at the 1983 and 1986 Boston Marathons.

== Professional running career ==
Schlesinger ran for Yale University, where many saw him as a rising star in the track and cross country sports. He set a record time in the six-mile run (which was previously held by Frank Shorter). Unfortunately, Schlesinger's progress faced setbacks. First he fell ill, and then he faced injuries.

He returned to health and finished fifth in the 1975 New Haven Big Three title race (behind co-winners Craig Masback and Larry Tractenberg, who tied). After moving on to Oxford, he set a record in the 5,000-meter race at the Harvard-Yale vs. Oxford-Cambridge matchup. He then took time off while in the midst of his studies and injuries.

But he was back running again in 1981 while living in South Korea as a translator. He raced the Seoul Marathon and finished ninth in 2:17:59.

The fall of 1982 came with a major breakthrough for Schlesinger, then studying at Harvard. He had trained in South Korea while working as an interpreter, so many didn't know if he would be a competitor at the Oct. 24 New York City Marathon. His mother thought he had a chance to finish 10th; he laughed her off.

But he kept up with the leaders in the race of nearly 14,000 runners, and by the end it was clear he was a contender. Despite being a true dark horse competitor, he finished third, behind Alberto Salazar and Rodolfo Gómez. Schlesinger had become a 2:11:54 marathoner. He flew back to Harvard the same day of the race, and the following morning he was sitting in a desk next to his surprised classmates.

His training included 120-mile weeks. Through the New York winter, he ran outside in layers of sweatpants, though he often ran without socks.

He was a recognized as a top runner at the start of the 1983 Boston Marathon, and ran a 2:11:37. His place was eighth—it was the deepest field ever run at Boston; 84 men broke the 2:20 barrier. He was hoping and training for an Olympic bid, but at the 1984 Olympic Trials Marathon in Buffalo, New York, he did not finish.

By 1986, he was back at Boston, where he finished 9th.

In 1987, he was in Duluth, Minnesota, and won the Grandma's Marathon (so named for the main sponsor, Grandma's Restaurant). In his race to the finish in 2:16:00, he put on several surges to drop hometown favorite Dick Beardsley.

In 1988, Schlesinger trained for the Staten Island Half Marathon, aiming to run with the leaders again. This time, he led the pack and broke the tape in 1:05:09. In the same year, he was selected to be on the American team to compete at the ASICS Ekiden along with Ross Donoghue, Jim Flynn, Charlie Bevier, and Bill Krohn.

In 1985 he set a record in the half marathon at the Maccabiah Games in a time of 1:05.56. The record still stands.

== Art career ==
Later in his career, Schlesinger became an artist whose oil paintings have gone to collectors around the world. He was chosen to be the illustrator for the Japanese edition of the Harry Potter book series.

== Personal life ==
Schlesinger was born in Freeport, New York. His father, a textile personnel recruiter, moved the family to Raleigh, North Carolina. He enrolled at Yale University, then received a Marshall Scholarship to Oxford University, where he studied for three years. His skills for language (and fluency in Japanese, Korean and English) took him to Seoul, South Korea, where he worked translating legal documents. He was there for two years before returning to the United States to enter Harvard Law School.
