= 2013 Maccabiah Games =

19th edition of Jewish multi-sport event

19th Maccabiah
- Host city: Jerusalem, Israel
- Nations: 77
- Debuting countries: 17
- Athletes: 7,500
- Events: 490 Medals 34 Sports
- Opening: July 18, 2013
- Closing: July 30, 2013
- Opened by: Shimon Peres
- Torchbearer: Aly Raisman
- Main venue: Teddy Stadium

The 19th Maccabiah Games (Hebrew: המכביה התשע-עשרה) were held during July 18 to 30, 2013.

The Games brought together 7,500 competing athletes, making it the third-largest international sporting event in the world after the Olympic Games and the FIFA World Cup. The Maccabiah held competitions in 42 disciplines, in 34 sports. A number of new sports were introduced or brought back, including archery, equestrian, and handball; ice hockey was brought back for the first time since 1997.

== History ==
The Maccabiah Games were first held in 1932. In 1961, they were declared a "Regional Sports Event" by, and under the auspices and supervision of, the International Olympic Committee. Among other Olympic and world champions, swimmer Mark Spitz won 10 Maccabiah gold medals before earning his first of nine Olympic gold medals.

== Opening ceremony ==
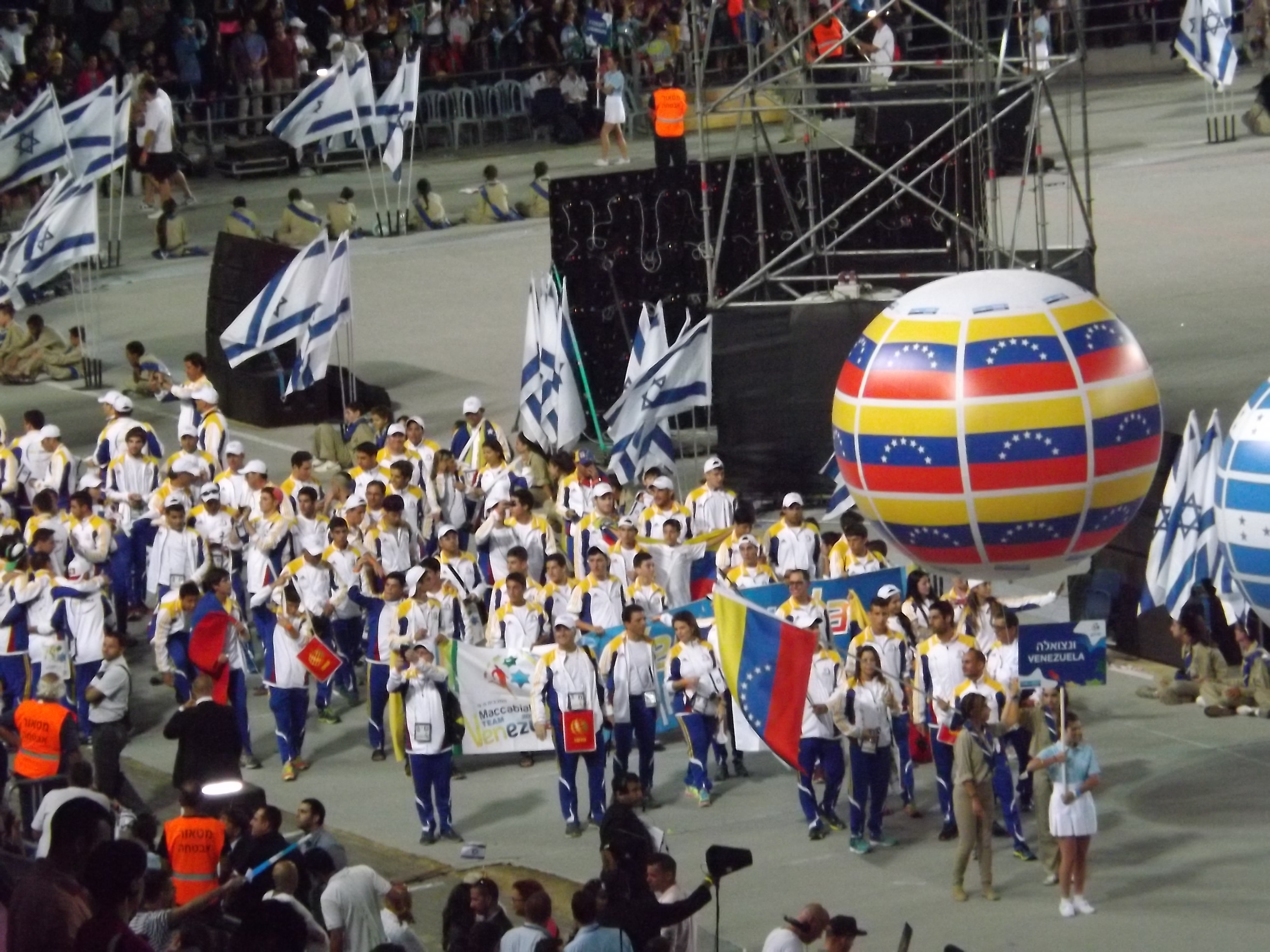
The Venezuelan delegation during the parade of nations.

The opening ceremonies for the 19th Maccabiah took place for the second time at the Teddy Stadium in Jerusalem. The games were officially opened by Shimon Peres. US President Barack Obama greeted the Maccabiah through a prerecorded video. Prime Minister David Cameron also greeted the Maccabiah and Team GB.

During the parade of nations, giant helium balloons with the country the delegation represented accompanied each delegation. Coincidentally, the opening ceremony took place on Nelson Mandela's birthday. The South African delegation carried with them a large banner reading: "Celebrating our legacy – Mandela Day".

U.S. Olympic gold medal-winning gymnast Aly Raisman lit the Maccabiah cauldron. The opening ceremonies were celebrated with performances by a number of popular musicians, including Rami Kleinstein and Harel Skaat. Additionally, Grammy-winning Israeli violinist Miri Ben-Ari and The X Factor finalist Carly Rose Sonenclar also performed at the ceremony.

== Notable medalists ==
Future National Football League player Anthony Firkser and Spencer Weisz, who was named tournament MVP, competed on the Under-18 USA National basketball team that won the gold medal. Stu Douglass, Ben Carter, and Evan Conti were part of Team USA's men's team, coached by Brad Greenberg and Mike Carter, which won a gold medal in basketball. Danny Schayes coached Team USA in basketball. American Jacqui Kalin played basketball for Team USA and led the women's team to a gold medal.

Israeli-American future Major League Baseball player Dean Kremer pitched for Team USA, along with Benjamin Feinman, a recent high school graduate, who threw a no-hitter on the opening day of competition for Team USA against Canada. This was the first no-hitter in the history of the Maccabiah Games. Team USA went on to take the gold medal in baseball, and Feinman was selected as the MVP of the baseball competition.

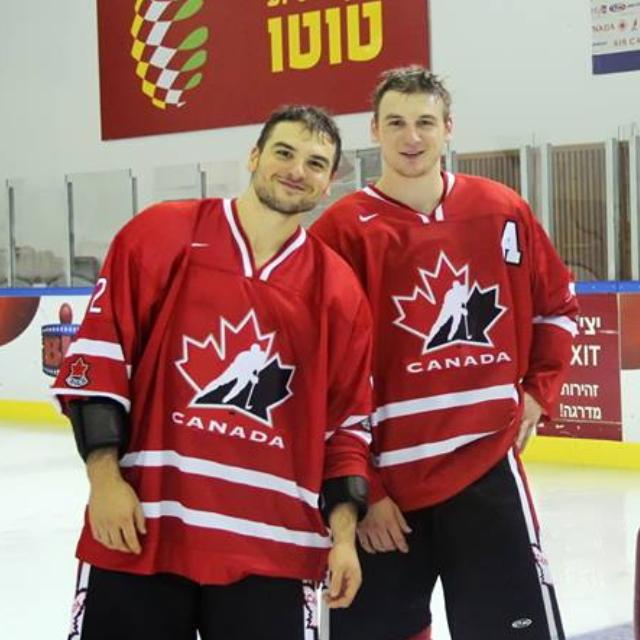
Zach Hyman and brother Spencer helped Team Canada win a gold medal at the Games.

Canadian National Hockey League player Zach Hyman had three goals and three assists in two games, and won a gold medal, and was joined on the team by Adam Henrich, Andrew Calof, and Olivier Dame-Malka. Team USA's masters hockey team, coached by Steve Glickman and led by Todd Lewis, upset Team Canada to win the gold medal. Canadian Olympic volleyball players Josh Binstock and Sam Schachter competed for Canada winning a silver medal in indoor volleyball, and Binstock was Canada's flag-bearer.

American Olympic medalist swimmer Garrett Weber-Gale won the gold medal in the men's 100 free with a time of 48.99, and won the gold medal in the men's 50 meter sprint with a new Maccabiah record time of 22.68 seconds. He also won a silver medal in the 4 × 200 m freestyle relay. Andrea Murez won five gold medals in swimming for the US, and two silver medals, and received the 2013 Maccabiah Games Most Outstanding Athlete Award for Women. Israeli Olympic swimmer Amit Ivry won a bronze medal in the Women's 100m freestyle, with a time of 57.19. Israeli Keren Siebner won two gold medals, in the 100m butterfly and the 400m freestyle relay team, which set a new Israeli record.

In soccer, Jacob Lissek joined Major League Soccer player Ross Friedman on Team USA, which captured a gold medal, as Friedman led the Games in assists. Canada won the bronze medal, with Alon Badat, Kilian Elkinson, and Gil Vainshtein playing for it. Footballer Scott Kashket played for Team GB Under-18, winning a bronze medal.

Marcel Felder of Uruguay won a gold medal in men's tennis.

Israeli Laetitia Beck won both an individual gold medal and a team gold medal at the Games, shooting 69 in each of the three rounds, finishing 9-under, 15 strokes ahead of her next competitor.

Canadian Sasha Gollish, who years later set an age-group world record in the mile, won the half-marathon. Israeli Olympic sprinter Donald Sanford broke the Israeli record and won the gold medal in the 400 meter race with a time of 45.65, defeating Australian Olympic finalist Steven Solomon (who also competed for Australia as captain of its junior soccer team). Israeli future Olympian Maor Tiyouri was a silver medalist in the 3000 m. Israeli two-time European champion Alex Averbuch returned from retirement and won the gold medal in the pole vault.

Israeli Olympian Neta Rivkin won the all-around gold medal in rhythmic gymnastics. Israel's Olympian Alex Tripolski won the gold medal in the 10 meter air pistol with a score of 571, and the silver medal in the 50 meter free pistol with a score of 530. Israeli Olympic badminton player Misha Zilberman won two gold medals. Israeli Daniel Poleshchuk won a gold medal in Men's Open Squash.

In karate, American Dov Sternberg won a gold medal in Team Kata. Israeli Olympic racing cyclist Shani Bloch won a silver medal in the women's triathlon. Canadian Anthony Housefather won seven medals (five silver medals and two bronze medals) in the Masters category in swimming.

In fencing, future cadet world champion Samuel Moelis won the gold medal in junior men's foil in both the individual event and as part of Team USA.

== Participating communities ==
77 countries that participated in the 19th Maccabiah.

Participating teams

- Albania
- Argentina
- Armenia
- Aruba
- Australia (400)
- Austria
- Azerbaijan
- Bahamas
- Belarus
- Belgium
- Bolivia
- Bosnia-Herzegovina
- Brazil (500)
- Canada (620)
- Chile
- Colombia
- Croatia
- Cuba (55)
- Curaçao
- Czech Republic
- Denmark
- Ecuador
- El Salvador
- Estonia
- Finland
- France
- Georgia
- Germany
- Gibraltar (20)
- Great Britain
- Greece
- Guatemala
- Guinea-Bissau (14)
- Honduras
- Hong Kong (17)
- Holland
- Hungary
- India (28)
- Israel
- Italy
- Kazakhstan
- Kyrgyzstan
- Latvia
- Lithuania
- Luxembourg
- Macedonia
- Mauritius (4)
- Mexico
- Moldova
- Mongolia (1)
- Morocco (1)
- Nicaragua
- Norway
- Panama
- Paraguay (6)
- Peru
- Poland
- Portugal
- Romania
- Russia
- Scotland
- Serbia
- Slovakia
- Slovenia (5)
- South Africa
- Spain
- Sweden
- Switzerland
- Suriname
- Turkey (48)
- Ukraine
- United States (1106)
- Uruguay
- U.S. Virgin Islands
- Uzbekistan
- Venezuela
- Zimbabwe

== Debuting countries ==
Debuting countries

Albania
Armenia
Aruba
Bahamas
Bosnia-Herzegovina
Cuba
Curaçao
Ecuador
El Salvador
Guinea-Bissau
Honduras
Mauritius
Mongolia
Nicaragua
Suriname

== Calendar ==
Calendar of tournaments.

OC	Opening ceremony	●	Event competitions	CC	Closing ceremony

July	18 Thu	19 Fri	20 Sat	21 Sun	22 Mon	23 Tue	24 Wed	25 Thu	26 Fri	27 Sat	28 Sun	29 Mon	30 Tue
Ceremonies	OC												CC
Archery					●	●	●	●					
Badminton				●	●	●							
Baseball	●	●		●	●	●	●	●	●				
Basketball	●	●		●	●	●	●	●	●		●	●	
Chess	●	●		●	●	●	●	●	●		●		
Cricket		●		●	●	●	●	●	●		●	●	
Cycling		●		●				●					
Equestrian						●	●	●					
Fencing				●	●								
Field hockey				●		●		●			●		
Football	●	●		●	●	●	●	●	●		●	●	
Futsal	●	●		●	●	●	●	●	●		●	●	
Golf	●	●		●	●	●	●	●					
Gymnastics						●	●	●					
Half marathon						●							
Handball				●	●	●	●	●	●				
Ice hockey		●	●	●	●	●	●	●	●				
Judo							●	●					
Karate				●	●								
Lawn bowls		●		●	●	●	●	●	●		●		
Netball				●	●	●	●	●	●		●		
Open water swimming											●		
Rhythmic gymnastics											●		
Rowing					●	●	●	●	●				
Rugby		●		●	●	●		●	●		●	●	
Shooting		●			●	●	●						
Softball	●	●		●	●	●	●	●	●		●	●	
Squash				●	●	●	●	●			●	●	
Swimming				●	●	●	●	●	●				
Table tennis				●	●	●	●	●					
Taekwondo							●						
Ten-pin bowling				●	●	●	●	●					
Tennis	●	●		●	●	●	●	●	●		●	●	
Track and field						●	●	●					
Triathlon									●				
Volleyball				●	●	●	●	●	●		●		
Water polo		●		●	●	●	●	●	●	●			
Wrestling				●	●								
July	18 Thu	19 Fri	20 Sat	21 Sun	22 Mon	23 Tue	24 Wed	25 Thu	26 Fri	27 Sat	28 Sun	29 Mon	30 Tue

== Medal count ==
=== Medals table for open competition ===
* Host nation (Israel)

Rank	Nation	Gold	Silver	Bronze	Total
1	Israel*	153	135	123	411
2	United States	77	60	59	196
3	Canada	9	11	14	34
4	Australia	6	7	10	23
5	Brazil	5	5	12	22
6	South Africa	4	4	9	17
7	Hungary	3	3	9	15
8	France	3	2	0	5
9	Argentina	2	8	4	14
10	Ukraine	2	2	4	8
11	Germany	2	1	3	6
12	Azerbaijan	2	0	1	3
13	Russia	1	5	10	16
14	Great Britain	1	5	4	10
15	Mexico	1	3	3	7
16	Netherlands	1	1	2	4
17	Slovenia	1	1	1	3
18	Cuba	1	0	2	3
19	Latvia	0	1	4	5
Totals (19 entries)		274	254	274	802

- Juniors Medal Table
- Masters Medal Table
- Open Medal Table
- Paralympics Medal Table

=== Combined medals table for all competitions (Juniors, Open, Paralympic, Masters) ===
* Host nation (Israel)

Rank	Nation	Gold	Silver	Bronze	Total
1	Israel*	285	271	299	855
2	United States	103	94	120	317
3	Russia	24	22	26	72
4	Canada	15	18	24	57
5	Australia	9	18	12	39
6	Brazil	8	6	16	30
7	Ukraine	8	4	3	15
8	South Africa	7	7	16	30
9	Hungary	4	2	8	14
10	Germany	4	1	4	9
11	Argentina	3	12	16	31
12	Great Britain	3	9	12	24
13	France	3	3	1	7
14	MWU	3	2	9	14
15	Mexico	2	2	8	12
16	Azerbaijan	2	0	3	5
17	Austria	2	0	1	3
18	Netherlands	1	2	2	5
19	Cuba	1	1	3	5
20	Slovenia	1	1	2	4
Totals (20 entries)		488	475	585	1,548

== Sports ==
The 2013 Maccabiah Games programme featured 34 sports encompassing 42 disciplines.

- Archery
- Athletics
  - Technical events
  - Track and field
  - Half marathon
- Badminton
- Baseball
- Basketball
- Chess
- Cricket
- Cycling
- Equestrian
- Fencing
- Field hockey
- Football
- Futsal
- Golf
- Gymnastics
  - Artistic gymnastics
  - Rhythmic gymnastics
- Handball
- Ice hockey
- Judo
- Karate
- Lawn bowls
- Netball
- Rowing
- Rugby union
- Shooting
- Softball
- Squash
- Table tennis
- Taekwondo
- Ten-pin bowling
- Tennis
- Triathlon
- Volleyball
- Water sports
  - Open water swimming
  - Swimming
  - Water polo
- Wrestling
  - Freestyle wrestling
  - Greco-Roman wrestling
