= Gary Gubner =

American sportsman (1942–2024)

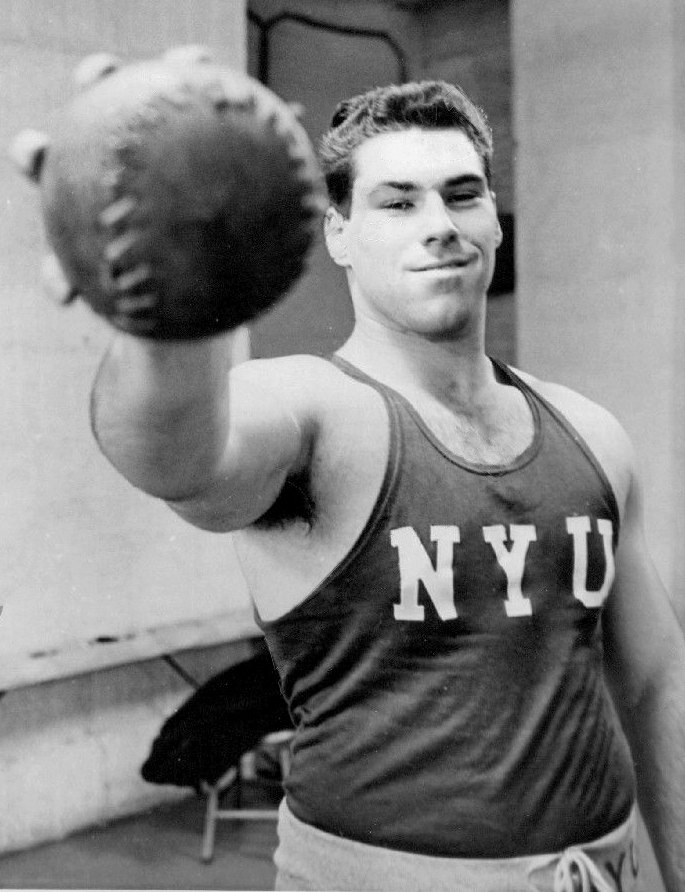
- Gubner in 1962

Personal information
- Born: December 1, 1942 New York, New York, U.S.
- Died: May 25, 2024 (aged 81)
- Height: 188 cm (6 ft 2 in)
- Weight: 120 kg (265 lb)

Sport
- Sport: Weightlifting, shot put, discus throw
- Club: Grand Street Boys' Club

Achievements and titles
- Personal best: SP – 19.80 m (1962)
Medal record
Representing the United States
World Championships
Bronze medal – third place	1962 Budapest	Weightlifting, +90 kg
Silver medal – second place	1965 Tehran	Weightlifting, +90 kg
Maccabiah Games
Gold medal – first place	1961 Israel	Weightlifting
Gold medal – first place	1961 Israel	Shot put
Gold medal – first place	1961 Israel	Discus

Gary Jay Gubner (December 1, 1942 – May 25, 2024) was an American heavyweight weightlifter, shot putter and discus thrower. He had his best results in weightlifting, winning two world championship medals in 1962 and 1965 and placing fourth at the 1964 Summer Olympics. He also attempted to qualify for the 1964 Olympics in throwing events, and finished fifth in the shot put at the U.S. Olympic trials. Gubner set several shot put records, including a 53-foot throw with a 16-lb. ball when he was 16, and three world indoor records in 1962. His best result of 19.80 m placed him second in the 1962 world ranking.

Representing the NYU Violets track and field team, Gubner won the 1963 and 1964 NCAA University Division Track and Field Championships in the shot put.

Gubner won gold medals at the 1961 Maccabiah Games in Israel in heavyweight weightlifting, shotput, and discus. He won the shot put with a 60-foot, 1-1/4 inch (18.32 meter) throw.

Inducted into the National Jewish Sports Hall of Fame and Museum, Gubner has also been recognized by the International Jewish Sports Hall of Fame in its 2000 book Jewish Sports Legends.

== See also ==
- List of select Jewish track and field athletes
- List of select Jewish weightlifters
