= List of Israeli records in athletics =

The following are the national records in athletics in Israel maintained by Israeli Athletic Association (IAA).

== Outdoor ==
Key to tables: Awaiting ratification Record not kept by IAA Not ratified or later rescinded by IAA

=== Men ===
Event	Record	Athlete	Date	Meet	Place	Ref.
100 m	10.09 (+1.8 m/s)	Blessing Afrifah	30 July 2025	Israeli Championships	Jerusalem, Israel	
150 m	15.57 (+0.6 m/s)	Blessing Afrifah	27 April 2023		Tel Aviv, Israel	
200 m	19.96 A (−1.0 m/s)	Blessing Afrifah	4 August 2022	World U20 Championships	Cali, Colombia	
300 m	32.76	Blessing Afrifah	30 December 2024	Open Meet Tel-Aviv 1	Tel Aviv, Israel	
400 m	45.04	Donald Sanford	19 July 2015	Brothers Znamensky Memorial	Zhukovsky, Russia	
600 m	1:16.03	Noam Mamu	5 May 2024	Internationales Läufermeeting	Pliezhausen, Germany	
800 m	1:46.81	Noam Mamu	10 July 2025	Meeting Internazionale Città di Nembro	Nembro, Italy	
800 m	1:46.46 (Note: not recognised by federation though he represented Israel at the 1984 Olympic Games)	Mark Handelsman	15 July 1982		Lausanne, Switzerland	
800 m	1:46.49 (Note: not recognised by federation though he represented Israel at the 1984 Olympic Games)	Mark Handelsman	31 August 1983		Koblenz, Germany	
1000 m	2:21.38	Ronnie Maoz	19 August 1983		Menden, Germany	
1500 m	3:34.51	Matan Ivri	11 July 2026	Moore-Guldensporenmeeting	Kortrijk, Belgium	
Mile	4:03.40 (Note: outdoor best; indoor mark ratified as absolute record)	Ronnie Maoz	20 August 1984		Hamburg, Germany	
2000 m	5:10.12	Itai Maggidi	8 January 2007		Tel Aviv, Israel	
3000 m	7:51.40	Gezachw Yossef	15 July 2009		Naimette-Xhovemont, Belgium	
5000 m	13:16.88	Tadesse Getahon	19 July 2025	KBC Night of Athletics	Heusden-Zolder, Belgium	
5 km (road)	13:44	Tadesse Getahon	7 January 2021		Yarkon Park, Israel	
10,000 m	27:33.99	Tadesse Getahon	20 May 2023	Night of the 10000m PBs	London, United Kingdom	
10 km (road)	27:43	Dereje Chekole	11 January 2026	10K Valencia Ibercaja by Kiprun	Valencia, Spain	
15 km (road)	42:53+	Tadesse Getahon	10 March 2024	NN CPC Loop Den Haag	The Hague, Netherlands	
20,000 m (track)	58:53.6+	Girmaw Amare	26 January 2020		Tel Aviv, Israel	
20 km (road)	57:53+	Tadesse Getahon	10 March 2024	NN CPC Loop Den Haag	The Hague, Netherlands	
20 km (road)	57:43+	Tadesse Getahon	15 September 2024	Copenhagen Half Marathon	Copenhagen, Denmark	
20 km (road)	56:58+	Gashau Ayale	9 March 2025	Lisbon Half Marathon	Lisbon, Portugal	
One hour	20384 m	Girmaw Amare	26 January 2020		Tel Aviv, Israel	
Half marathon	59:59	Gashau Ayale	9 March 2025	Lisbon Half Marathon	Lisbon, Portugal	
25 km (road)	1:13:31+	Gashau Ayale	18 February 2024	Seville Marathon	Seville, Spain	
30 km (road)	1:28:07+	Gashau Ayale	18 February 2024	Seville Marathon	Seville, Spain	
Marathon	2:04:44	Maru Teferi	1 December 2024	Valencia Marathon	Valencia, Spain	
110 m hurdles	13.77 (+1.7 m/s)	Sagi Lamdiel	5 July 2026	Maccabiah Games	Jerusalem, Israel	
300 m hurdles	35.73	Omri Shiff	26 July 2026	Open Meet Tel Aviv 8	Tel Aviv, Israel	
400 m hurdles	49.82	Omri Shiff	14 August 2025	Grand Slam Jerusalem	Jerusalem, Israel	
2000 m steeplechase	5:44.92	Itai Maggidi	25 June 2000		Tel Aviv, Israel	
2000 m steeplechase	5:41.49	Zemenu Muchie	14 August 2025	Grand Slam Jerusalem	Jerusalem, Israel	
3000 m steeplechase	8:24.14	Itai Maggidi	4 July 2008		Metz, France	
High jump	2.36 m	Konstantin Matusevich	5 February 2000		Perth, Australia	
Pole vault	5.93 m	Aleksandr Averbukh	19 July 2003		Madrid, Spain	
Long jump	7.99 m (+1.1 m/s)	Yochai Halevi	15 May 2010		Tel Aviv, Israel	
Triple jump	17.20 m (+0.9 m/s)	Rogel Nachum	6 June 1992		Seville, Spain	
Triple jump	17.20 m (+1.6 m/s)	Rogel Nachum	19 July 1998		Tel Aviv, Israel	
Shot put	19.41 m	Menachem Mendel Chen	27 May 2026	NCAA Division I West First Rounds	Fayetteville, United States	
Discus throw	62.24 m	Igor Avrunin	1 June 1991		Tel Aviv, Israel	
Hammer throw	65.70 m	Igor Giller	6 May 1995		Tel Aviv, Israel	
Hammer throw	72.00 m	Oleksandr Dryhol	22 June 2016		Tel Aviv, Israel	
Javelin throw	81.94 m	Vadim Bavikin	8 June 2004		Zaragoza, Spain	
Decathlon	7343 pts	Ariel Attias	13–14 May 2023	Missouri Valley Conference Championships	Des Moines, United States	
Decathlon	100m (wind) / Long jump (wind) / Shot put / High jump / 400m / 110m H (wind) / Discus / Pole vault / Javelin / 1500m; 11.35 (+1.7 m/s) / 7.01 m (−0.9 m/s) / 14.46 m / 1.93 m / 52.20 / 15.59 (+0.6 m/s) / 41.89 m / 4.60 m / 61.15 m / 5:10.29					
10,000 m walk (track)	41:51.40	Vladimir Ostrovskiy	26 May 1993		Tel Aviv, Israel	
20 km walk (road)	1:23:01	Vladimir Ostrovskiy	15 February 1992		Ein Gedi, Israel	
50 km walk (road)	4:17:07 (Note: by World Athletics source; 4:17:06 by IAA source)	Shaul Ladany	2 July 1972		Marcinelle, Belgium	
50 miles walk (road)	7:23:50 ^{[WB]} (Note: by IAA source, questionable due to 7:44;47.2 by other sources)	Shaul Ladany	1972		New Jersey, United States	
4 × 100 m relay	38.81	Israel; Rafel Yaar; Gideon Jablonka; Tommy Kafri; Aleksandr Porkhomovskiy	28 August 1999	World Championships	Seville, Spain	
4 × 200 m relay	1:23.98	Maccabi Tel Aviv; Micky Bar-Yeoshua; Kfir Golan; Tommy Kafri; Aleksandr Porkhomovskiy	1 July 2000		Antony, France	
4 × 400 m relay	3:09.93	Israel	23 June 2013		Kaunaus, Lithuania	
4 × 400 m relay	3:08.78 (Note: not ratified by IAA but recognised by World Athletics)	Israel; Y. Shapsai; Donald Sanford; D. Emrani; Aleksandr Porkhomovskiy	3 June 2012		Bydgoszcz, Poland	
4 × 400 m relay	3:06.52	Israel	27 May 2015		Patiala, India	
4 × 800 m relay	7:42.28	Hapoel Emek Hefer; Yair Karni; Doron Zimman; Shmuel Schusterman; Shlomo Azulay	25 May 1986		Tel Aviv, Israel	
4 × 1500 m relay	15:52.27	Hapoel Emek Hefer; Shmuel Schusterman; Doron Zimman; Yair Karni; Shlomo Azulay	24 May 1986		Tel Aviv, Israel	

=== Women ===
Event	Record	Athlete	Date	Meet	Place	Ref.	Video
100 m	11.06 (+1.2 m/s)	Diana Vaisman	3 July 2022	Resisprint International	La Chaux-de-Fonds, Switzerland		
200 m	23.15 (+2.0 m/s)	Irina Lenskiy	23 June 2002		Belgrade, Yugoslavia		
300 m	38.17	Darlene Asante	16 January 2026	Open Meet Tel-Aviv 2	Tel Aviv, Israel		
400 m	52.06	Anna Tkach	24 August 2003	World Championships	Saint-Denis, France		
600 m	1:28.12	Rachel Perez-Martinez	31 July 2024	Open meet	Jerusalem, Israel		
800 m	2:02.59	Shanie Landen	18 June 2024	Boysen Memorial	Oslo, Norway		
1000 m	2:43.99 (Note: outdoor best; indoor mark ratified as absolute record)	Karawan Halabi	15 February 2022		Tel Aviv, Israel		
1500 m	4:09.36	Sivan Auerbach	26 May 2024	IFAM Outdoor	Brussels, Belgium		
Mile	4:46.1 h (Note: outdoor best; indoor mark ratified as absolute record)	Anat Meiri	5 August 1980		Tel Aviv, Israel		
2000 m	5:52.3 h	Lonah Chemtai Salpeter	2 February 2019		Tel Aviv, Israel		
3000 m	8:42.88	Lonah Chemtai Salpeter	18 August 2018	Diamond League	Birmingham, United Kingdom		
5000 m	14:53.43	Selamawit Teferi	30 July 2021	Olympic Games	Tokyo, Japan		
5 km (road)	15:15+	Lonah Chemtai Salpeter	15 February 2019		Or Yehuda, Israel		
10,000 m	30:46.37	Lonah Chemtai Salpeter	15 August 2022	European Championships	Munich, Germany		
10 km (road)	30:05 Mx	Lonah Chemtai Salpeter	1 September 2019	Tilburg 10 Miles	Tilburg, Netherlands		
15 km (road)	47:28+	Lonah Chemtai Salpeter	14 October 2018	Lisbon Half Marathon	Lisbon, Portugal		
15 km (road)	46:43+	Lonah Chemtai Salpeter	6 April 2019	Prague Half Marathon	Prague, Czech Republic		
10 miles (road)	50:45 a	Lonah Chemtai Salpeter	23 September 2018	Dam tot Damloop	Amsterdam, Netherlands		
One hour	18571 m	Lonah Chemtai Salpeter	4 September 2020	Memorial van Damme	Brussels, Belgium		
20 km (road)	1:05:32+	Lonah Chemtai Salpeter	24 March 2018	World Half Marathon Championships	Valencia, Spain		
20 km (road)	1:02:43+	Lonah Chemtai Salpeter	6 April 2019	Prague Half Marathon	Prague, Czech Republic		
Half marathon	1:06:09	Lonah Chemtai Salpeter	6 April 2019	Prague Half Marathon	Prague, Czech Republic		
Half marathon	1:07:55 Wo	Lonah Chemtai Salpeter	14 October 2018	Lisbon Half Marathon	Lisbon, Portugal		
25 km (road)	1:28:48	Lonah Chemtai Salpeter	14 May 2017	Big 25 Berlin	Berlin, Germany		
25 km (road)	1:26:04+	Lonah Chemtai Salpeter	25 November 2018	Florence Marathon	Florence, Italy		
25 km (road)	1:23:25+	Lonah Chemtai Salpeter	5 May 2019	Prague Marathon	Prague, Czech Republic		
25 km (road)	1:22:00+	Lonah Chemtai Salpeter	1 March 2020	Tokyo Marathon	Tokyo, Japan		
30 km (road)	1:38:18+ Wo	Lonah Chemtai Salpeter	13 March 2022	Nagoya Women's Marathon	Nagoya, Japan		
Marathon	2:17:45	Lonah Chemtai Salpeter	1 March 2020	Tokyo Marathon	Tokyo, Japan		
100 m hurdles	12.80 (+1.0 m/s)	Irina Lenskiy	7 July 2002		Rethymno, Greece		
200 m hurdles	28.26	Puha Neiger	1989		Israel		
300 m hurdles	40.93	Noah Levy	26 July 2026	Open Meet Tel Aviv 8	Tel Aviv, Israel		
400 m hurdles	56.09	Irina Lenskiy	18 June 2000		Kyiv, Ukraine		
2000 m steeplechase	6:28.65	Adva Cohen	10 September 2023	Hanžeković Memorial	Zagreb, Croatia		
3000 m steeplechase	9:19.90	Adva Cohen	15 September 2025	World Championships	Tokyo, Japan		
High jump	1.92 m (Note: Indoor mark ratified as absolute record)	Danielle Frenkel	30 July 2010	European Championships	Barcelona, Spain		
High jump	1.92 m	Ma'ayan Fureman-Shahaf	9 August 2011		Neurim, Israel		
High jump	1.92 m	Ma'ayan Fureman-Shahaf	17 July 2013		Tel Aviv, Israel		
Pole vault	4.30 m (Note: Indoor mark ratified as absolute record)	Naama Bernstein	14 June 2021		Tel Aviv, Israel		
Pole vault	4.30 m	Naama Bernstein	23 May 2022		Tel Aviv, Israel		
Pole vault	4.60 m (Note: Mark not ratified because Schwartz did not live in Israel at least one year)	Jillian Schwartz	12 June 2010	Adidas Grand Prix	New York City, United States		
Long jump	6.52 m (+0.4 m/s)	Hanna Knyazyeva-Minenko	17 July 2014	78th Israeli Championships	Tel Aviv, Israel		
Triple jump	14.78 m (−0.1 m/s)	Hanna Knyazyeva-Minenko	24 August 2015	World Championships	Beijing, China		
Shot put	17.22 m	Anastasia Muchkaev	28 April 2012		Tel Aviv, Israel		
Discus throw	59.92 m	Sivan Jean	16 February 2008		Tel Aviv, Israel		
Discus throw	60.37 m	Yevgeniya Zabolotniy	21 April 2012		Tel Aviv, Israel		
Hammer throw	60.60 m	Yevgeniya Zabolotniy	19 May 2015		Neurim, Israel		
Hammer throw	61.78 m (Note: not ratified by IAA but recognised by World Athletics)	Margarita Belov	15 April 2017		Tel Aviv, Israel		
Javelin throw	64.56 m	Marharyta Dorozhon	11 June 2015	Bislett Games	Oslo, Norway		
Heptathlon	6031 pts	Svetlana Gnezdilov	12–13 August 2003		Tel Aviv, Israel		
Heptathlon	100m H (wind) / High jump / Shot put / 200m (wind) / Long jump (wind) / Javelin / 800m; 13.26 (+1.9 m/s) / 1.68 m / 12.38 m / 24.28 / 6.31 m (+1.1 m/s) / 34.92 m / 2:10.39						
5000 m walk (track)	23:44.1 (Note: ratified by IAA but not recognised by World Athletics)	Iulia Kotler	28 April 1998		Tel Aviv, Israel		
10,000 m walk (track)	50:51.1 (Note: ratified by IAA but not recognised by World Athletics)	Dorit Attias	1991				
10 km (road)	47:46	Iulia Kotler	25 October 1997		Mukachevo, Ukraine		
20 km walk (road)	1:40:12 (Note: by IAA source and World Athletics statistic handbook; 1:40:11 by World Athletics profile)	Iulia Kotler	29 July 1999		Tel Aviv, Israel		
50 km walk (road)							
4 × 100 m relay	44.79	Israel; Gal Kadmon; Diana Vaisman; Olga Lenskay Yarko; Ilana Dorfman	24 August 2019	Diamond League	Paris, France		
4 × 200 m relay	1:40.79	Hapoel Jerusalem; Sharon Lev; Mazal Mantzuri; Puha Neiger; Tami Bloch	28 May 1989		Tel Aviv, Israel		
Swedish relay	2:14.13	Hapoel Jerusalem	1988		Israel		
4 × 400 m relay	3:32.99	Israel; Irina Lenskiy; Svetlana Gnezdilov; Anat Morad; Anna Tkach	30 August 2003	World Championships	St. Denis, France		
4 × 800 m relay	9:15.5	ASA Tel Aviv	27 June 1982		Tel Aviv, Israel		

=== Mixed ===
Event	Record	Athlete	Date	Meet	Place	Ref.
4 × 400 m relay	3:24.04	Israel; Mohamed Abu Anza; Shani Zakay; Omri Shiff; Gal Natanel	29 June 2025	European Team Championships	Maribor, Slovenia	

== Indoor ==
=== Men ===
Event	Record	Athlete	Date	Meet	Place	Ref.
60 y	6.41	Tal Mor	4 February 2006		Lubbock, United States	
60 m	6.68	Aleksandr Porkhomovskiy	21 February 1999		Samara, Russia	
60 m	6.68	Attila Farkas	26 January 2002		Budapest, Hungary	
200 m	20.69	Blessing Afrifah	10 February 2024	Meeting Hauts-de-France Pas-de-Calais	Liévin, France	
300 y	31.8 h	Manny Rosenberg	February 1984		Carbondale, United States	
300 m	34.12 A	Itai Iluz	March 1987		Pocatello, United States	
400 m	46.46	Donald Sanford	8 February 2014	David Hemery Valentine Invitational	Boston, United States	
440 y	50.8 h	Yoav Mekel	19 February 1984		West Point, United States	
500 m	1:00.86	Donald Sanford	25 January 2014	BU John Thomas Terrier Invitational	Boston, United States	
600 m	1:17.28	Noam Mamu	8 February 2025	Meeting Metz Moselle Athleor	Metz, France	
800 m	1:49.69	Noam Mamu	27 January 2024	14e AV PEC 1910 Indoor	Apeldoorn, Netherlands	
800 m	1:49.62 OT	Gezachw Yossef	3 February 2001		Lubbock, United States	
800 m	1:47.81	Dustin Emrani	11 February 2012	Boston University Valentine Invitational	Boston, United States	
1000 m	2:24.49	Gezachw Yossef	24 January 1998		Columbia, Missouri, United States	
1000 m	2:12.0 h	Mark Handelsman	17 February 1984		San Diego, United States	
1000 m	2:23.87	Dustin Emrani	13 January 2012	NYC Gotham Cup	New York City, United States	
1500 m	3:47.85	Itai Maggidi	25 February 2005		Clemson, United States	
Mile	3:57.89	Matan Ivri	6 February 2026	Badgers Windy City Invite	Chicago, United States	
3000 m	7:43.88	Matan Ivri	13 February 2026	BU David Hemery Valentine Invitational	Boston, United States	
Two miles	8:51.9 h	Yair Karni	27 January 1979		Portland, United States	
5000 m	13:45.52	Matan Ivri	7 December 2024	Boston University Sharon Colyear-Danville Season Opener	Boston, United States	
5000 m	13:29.58	Adisu Guadia	6 December 2025	BU Sharon Colyear-Danville Season Opener	Boston, United States	
5000 m	13:27.23 OT	Adisu Guadia	14 February 2026	Husky Classic	Seattle, United States	
60 m hurdles	7.86	Dor Hayon	28 January 2024	Elán Miting	Bratislava, Slovakia	
High jump	2.31 m	Konstantin Matusevich	10 March 1996	European Championships	Stockholm, Sweden	
Pole vault	5.86 m	Aleksandr Averbukh	15 February 2001		Stockholm, Sweden	
Long jump	7.78 m	Aviram Schwartzbard	26 February 2022		New York City, United States	
Triple jump	16.93 m	Rogel Nachum	1 March 1998	European Championships	Valencia, Spain	
Shot put	19.36 m	Itamar Levi	27 January 2018	ASU Invitational	Jonesboro, United States	
Weight throw	19.99 m	Adar Sheere	27 January 2021		South Bend, United States	
Heptathlon	5680 pts	Etamar Bhastekar	29-30 January 2021	Razorback Invitational	Fayetteville, United States	
Heptathlon	60m / Long jump / Shot put / High jump / 60m H / Pole vault / 1000m; 6.97 / 6.99 m / 10.63 m / 1.95 m / 8.32 / 5.25 m / 2:46.49					
5000 m walk	19:17.45	Vladimir Ostrovskiy	23 February 1991		Prague, Czech Republic	
4 × 400 m relay						

=== Women ===
Event	Record	Athlete	Date	Meet	Place	Ref.
50 m	6.4 h	Esther Shahamorov	15 January 1972		Dortmund, West Germany	
60 m	7.20	Diana Vaisman	18 March 2022 (Note: by official result source; 19 March 2022 by IAA source, a typo)	World Championships	Belgrade, Serbia	
60 m	7.1 h	Esther Rot	12 February 1976		Bucharest, Romania	
200 m	23.96	Mercy Afrifah	14 February 2026	One day Indoor Match	Athens, Greece	
200 m	23.96	Darlene Asante	14 February 2026	One day Indoor Match	Athens, Greece	
300 m	40.89	Rita Pogorelov	12 January 2008		Bowling Green, United States	
400 m	55.34	Olga Dor-Dogadko	14 February 1999	Indoor Flanders Meeting	Ghent, Belgium	
500 m	1:13.61	Shanie Landen	12 February 2016	David Hemery Valentine Invitational	Boston, United States	
500 m	1:09.64	Anna Tkach	7 January 2003		Moscow, Russia	
600 m	1:35.70 OT	Shanie Landen	16 January 2016	UW Indoor Preview	Seattle, United States	
800 m	2:07.46	Sivan Auerbach	27 January 2024	Razorback Invitational	Fayetteville, United States	
1000 m	2:43.65	Sivan Auerbach	12 January 2024	Arkansas Invitational	Fayetteville, United States	
1500 m	4:12.44+	Adva Cohen	2 March 2025	BU Last Chance National Qualifier	Boston, United States	
Mile	4:31.10	Adva Cohen	2 March 2025	BU Last Chance National Qualifier	Boston, United States	
3000 m	8:48.11	Selamawit Teferi	14 February 2022	Meeting de l’Eure	Val-de-Reuil, France	
5000 m	15:23.93	Adva Cohen	7 December 2024	BU Sharon Colyear-Danville Season Opener	Boston, United States	
60 m hurdles	8.03	Irina Lenskiy	27 January 2002	Russian Winter Meeting	Moscow, Russia	
High jump	1.94 m	Danielle Frenkel	5 March 2011	European Championships	Paris, France	
Pole vault	4.35 m	Naama Bernstein	3 February 2021	Czech Indoor Gala	Ostrava, Czech Republic	
Pole vault	4.60 m (Note: Mark not ratified because Schwartz did not live in Israel at least one year)	Jillian Schwartz	30 May 2010		Jonesboro, United States	
Long jump	6.32 m	Eden Finkelstein	10 February 2019		Istanbul, Turkey	
Long jump	6.33 m	Romi Tamir	10 January 2026	Illini Open	Champaign, United States	
Triple jump	14.49 m	Hanna Knyazyeva-Minenko	8 March 2015	European Championships	Prague, Czech Republic	
Shot put	16.78 m	Annastasia Muchkaev	25 January 2013	Jayhawk Classic	Lawrence, United States	
Weight throw	19.97 m	Estel Valeanu	26 February 2023	Ivy League Championships	Hanover, United States	
Pentathlon	3993 pts	Marina Lippis	18 February 1999		Minsk, Belarus	
Pentathlon	60m H / High jump / Shot put / Long jump / 800m; 8.97 / 1.66 m / 13.93 m / 5.71 m / 2:28.63					
1500 m walk	7:06.12	Dorit Attias	17 February 1990		East Rutherford, United States	
Mile walk	7:27.7 h	Dorit Attias	14 February 1988		Alexandria, United States	
3000 m walk	15:19.4 h	Dorit Attias	7 January 1990		Princeton, United States	
4 × 400 m relay						
