= Athletics at the 2010 South American Games – Women's 100 metre hurdles =

The Women's 100m Hurdles event at the 2010 South American Games was held on March 20 at 18:15.

== Medalists ==
| Gold | Silver | Bronze |
|---|---|---|
| Agustina Zerboni; Argentina | Anita Souza; Brazil | Giuliana Franciosi (Peru) Perú |

== Records ==
Standing records prior to the 2010 South American Games
| World record | Yordanka Donkova | Bulgaria | 12.21 | Stara Zagora, Bulgaria | 20 August 1988 |
| World Leading | Irina Lenskiy | Israel | 13.26 | Tel Aviv, Israel | 17 February 2010 |
| South American record | Maurren Higa Maggi | Brazil | 12.71 | Manaus, Brazil | 19 May 2001 |
| South American U23 record | Maíla Paula Machado | Brazil | 12.93 | Americana, Brazil | 7 September 2002 |

== Results ==
Results were published.

=== Final ===
| Rank | Athlete | Nationality | Reaction | Result | Notes |
|---|---|---|---|---|---|
| 1st place, gold medalist(s) | Agustina Zerboni | Argentina | 0.190 | 13.66 | SB |
| 2nd place, silver medalist(s) | Anita Souza | Brazil | 0.201 | 13.69 | |
| 3rd place, bronze medalist(s) | Giuliana Franciosi | (Peru) Perú | 0.203 | 13.87 | SB |
| 4 | Giselle de Albuquerque | Brazil | 0.186 | 14.04 | |
| 5 | Ljubica Milos | Chile | 0.185 | 14.12 | SB |
| 6 | Natalia Pinzón | Colombia | 0.180 | 15.25 | SB |

== See also ==
- 2010 South American Under-23 Championships in Athletics
