= Vladimir Ostrovskiy =

Israeli racewalker

Vladimir Ostrovskiy (Russian: Владимир Островский; born 12 December 1966) is a retired USSR-born Israeli race walker.

He represented the Soviet Union before changing nationality to Israel. In the 20 kilometres walk he finished 23rd at the 1991 World Championships and 33rd at the 1993 World Championships. At the 1995 World Championships he did not finish.

He stands 1.74 m (5 ft 8 1/2 in) tall, and weighed about 54 kilograms (119 lb) during his active career.

== IAAF controversy ==
Vladimir Ostrovskiy emigrated to Israel in 1990. International Amateur Athletic Federation (IAAF) requires an emigrating citizen to live for three years in a new country before competing. However, the president of the Soviet track and field federation, Igor Ter-Ovanesyan, signed an agreement that allowed recent Soviet emigres to Israel to compete after just one year of residence.

The agreement enabled Israel to add three athletes — Igor Avrunin in the shot-put and discus, Vadim Bavikin in the javelin and Vladimir Ostrovskiy in the 20-kilometer walk — to its team of Rogel Nachum (men's triple jump) and Orit Kolodni (women's 200 and 400 meters).

Thanks to this agreement Vladimir Ostrovskiy was able to participate at the 1991 World Championship in Tokyo and the 1993 World Championship in Stuttgart, Germany.

== See also ==
- List of Israeli records in athletics
