= Diana Vaisman =

Belarusian-born Israeli sprinter

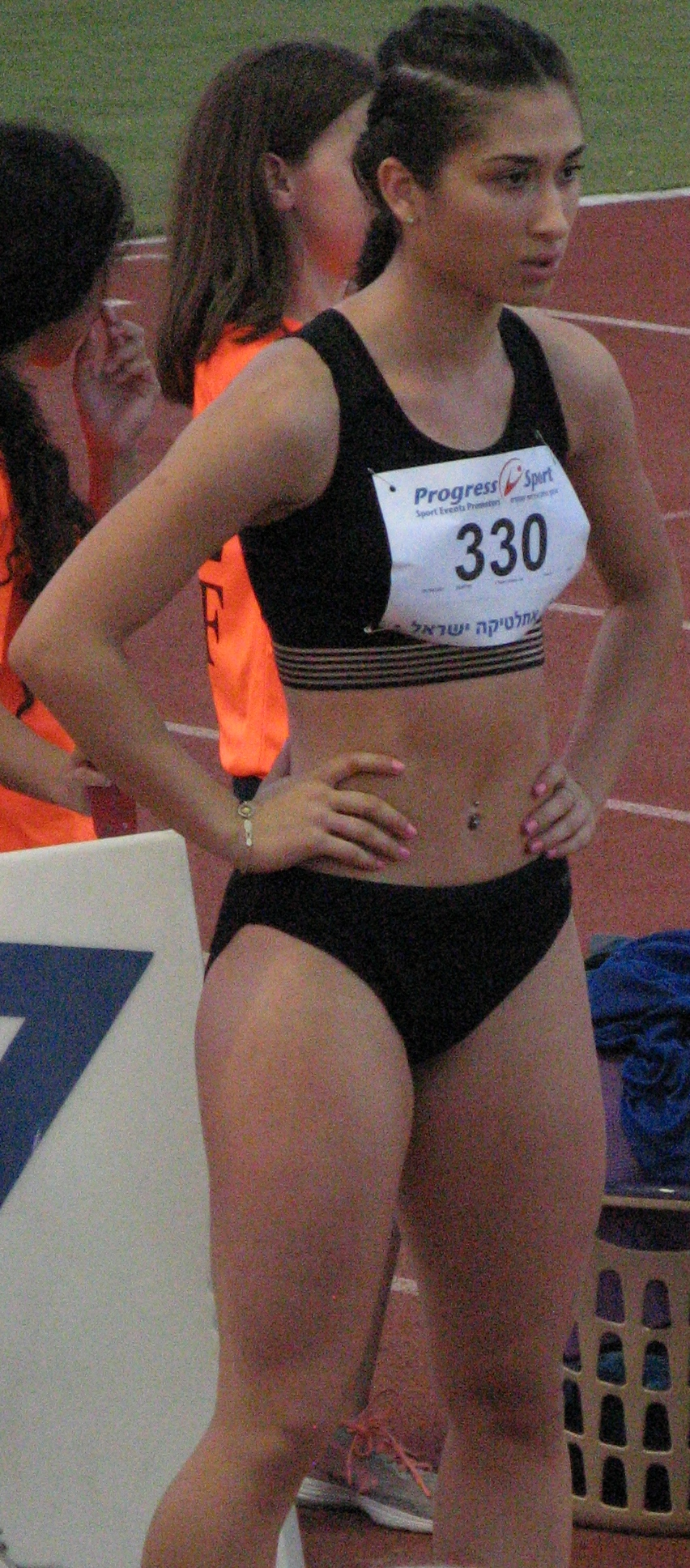
- Vaisman in 2016

Personal information
- Native name: דיאנה ויסמן
- Nationality: Israel
- Born: 23 July 1998 (age 28) Minsk, Belarus
- Height: 1.65 m (5 ft 5 in)
- Weight: 56 kg (123 lb)

Sport
- Sport: Athletics
- Events: 100 m, 200 m
- Club: Maccabi Rishon LeZion
- Coached by: Irina Vaisman and Irina Lenskiy
Medal record
Representing Israel
Balkan Indoor Championships
Gold medal – first place	2019 Belgrade	60 m indoor
Gold medal – first place	2020 Istanbul	60 m indoor
Bronze medal – third place	2017 Belgrade	60 m indoor
Bronze medal – third place	2018 Istanbul	60 m indoor
Maccabiah Games
Gold medal – first place	2017 Israel	100 m

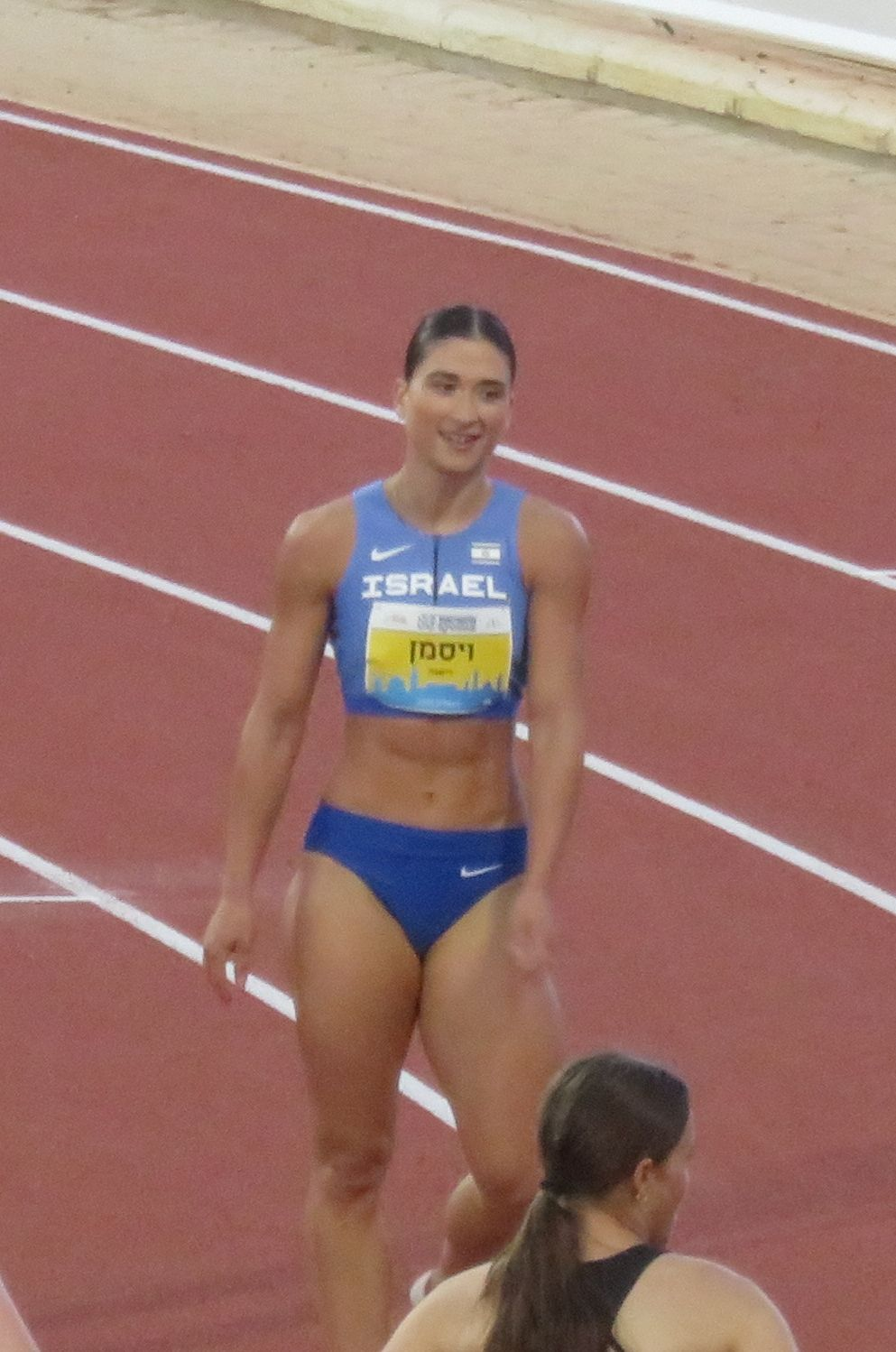
Vaisman in 2022

Diana Vaisman (or Weissman, Hebrew: דיאנה ויסמן; Belarusian: Диана Вейсман, born 23 July 1998) is a Belarusian-born Israeli track and field athlete and sprinter. She holds the Israeli national record in the 100 metre sprint.

== Early and personal life ==
Vaisman was born in Minsk, Belarus, to Irena and Vladimir Vaisman. Her family immigrated to Israel with her, when she was two years old. They reside in Ashkelon, Israel. Her mother Irina Vaisman is a former athlete and a current coach, and coaches her as does Irina Lenskiy. Vaisman's family is of Ashkenazi Jewish descent.

She was enlisted and served as a soldier in the Israel Defense Forces.

She married her Israeli boyfriend Max Shvarzman on 7 April 2022.

== Running career ==
Vaisman's club is Maccabi Rishon LeZion.

=== 60 metres ===
Vaisman represented Israel in the 60 metres at two European Athletics Indoor Championships, in 2017 and 2019, reaching the semifinals on the second occasion. In February 2018 she won a bronze medal in the 60 m sprint with a time of 7.49 at the 2018 Balkan Athletics Indoor Championships in Istanbul, Turkey. In January 2019 at the 2019 Mediterranean Athletics U23 Indoor Championships in Miramas, France, she won a bronze medal in the 60 metres with a time of 7.45. In February 2019 she won a gold medal in the 60 m sprint with a time of 7.34 at the 2019 Balkan Athletics Indoor Championships in Istanbul.

In a competition held in Rishon LeZion on 27 February 2022 she set a new Israeli record of 7.23 seconds in the 60 meters race. A week later, in a competition held at the AccorHotels Arena in Paris, France, on 6 March, she finished fourth in the 60 meters race with a new Israeli record of 7.23 seconds.

=== 100 metres ===
In July 2017 at the 2017 Maccabiah Games she set the Games record in the 100 m dash with a time of 11.71. In June 2018 at the 2018 Mediterranean Athletics U23 Championships in Jesolo, Italy, Vaisman won a silver medal in the 100 metres with a time of 11.59.

Vaisman is Israel's national record holder in the 100 metres (11.38 seconds), having in July 2018 at 19 years of age at the Israel Athletic Championship in Tel Aviv broken a long-standing 46-year record of Esther Roth-Shahamorov going back to the 1972 Summer Olympics. In June 2019 at the 2019 European Games, Vaisman set a new Israeli national record in the 100 metres, running it in 11:35 seconds. In July 2019 she ran the 100 metres in 11.27 at the 83rd Israel Athletic Championships, lowering her Israeli national record. In 2019, she competed in the women's 100 metres event at the 2019 World Athletics Championships held in Doha, Qatar. She did not qualify to compete in the semi-finals.

At the Israeli Championships held at the Givat Ram Stadium in Jerusalem she won the gold medal in the 100 meters race with a time of 11.28 seconds, ahead of Alina Droutman from Leader Jerusalem (11.90 seconds) and Ilanit Dorfman from Hapoel Holon (12.13 seconds). In the preliminaries she set a new Israeli record of 11.22 seconds.

At a competition held in La Chaux-de-Fonds, Switzerland on 3 July that year she won the gold medal in the 100 meters race with a new Israeli record of 11.06 seconds, ahead of Dafne Schippers from the Netherlands (11.13 seconds).

At the 2022 European Athletics Championships held in Munich she ran the 100m in 11.29 seconds and did not advance to the semifinals, although she was less than a tenth of a second away from qualifying.

== International competitions ==
Year	Competition	Venue	Position	Event	Notes
Representing Israel
2013	European Youth Olympic Festival	Utrecht, Netherlands	21st (h)	100 m	12.82 (w)
2013	European Youth Olympic Festival	Utrecht, Netherlands	17th (h)	200 m	26.49 (w)
2015	World Youth Championships	Cali, Colombia	10th (sf)	100 m	11.79
2015	World Youth Championships	Cali, Colombia	–	200 m	DQ
2016	World U20 Championships	Bydgoszcz, Poland	11th (sf)	100	11.66
2017	European Indoor Championships	Belgrade, Serbia	33rd (h)	60 m	7.54
2017	European U20 Championships	Grosseto, Italy	11th (sf)	100 m	11.88
2017	European U20 Championships	Grosseto, Italy	30th (h)	200 m	24.85
2017	European U20 Championships	Grosseto, Italy	16th (h)	4 × 100 m relay	46.46
2018	Balkan Indoor Championships	Istanbul, Turkey	3rd	60 m	7.49
2018	Mediterranean U23 Championships	Jesolo, Italy	2nd	100 m	11.59
2018	Mediterranean U23 Championships	Jesolo, Italy	4th	4 × 100 m relay	47.06
2018	European Championships	Berlin, Germany	14th (h)	100 m	11.61
2019	Balkan Indoor Championships	Istanbul, Turkey	1st	60 m	7.34
2019	European Indoor Championships	Glasgow, Scotland	11th (sf)	60 m	7.32
2019	European U23 Championships	Gävle, Sweden	4th	100 m	11.48
2019	World Championships	Doha, Qatar	30th (h)	100 m	11.39
2021	Olympic Games	Tokyo, Japan	23rd (h)	100 m	11.27
2022	World Indoor Championships	Belgrade, Serbia	17th (sf)	60 m	7.20
2022	World Championships	Eugene, United States	29th (h)	100 m	11.29
2022	European Championships	Munich, Germany	9th (sf)	100 m	11.36

== Personal bests ==
Outdoor

- 100 metres – 11.27 (+0.5 m/s, Tel Aviv 2019)
- 200 metres – 23.78 (-0.9 m/s, Tel Aviv 2018)

Indoor

- 60 metres – 7.32 (Glasgow 2019)

== See also ==
- List of Israeli records in athletics
- List of Maccabiah records in athletics
