= Alighieri (surname) =

Alighieri is a surname. Notable people with the surname include:

- Dante Alighieri (1265–1321), Italian poet, writer, and philosopher

- Jacopo Alighieri (1289–1348), Italian poet, son of Dante Alighieri

- Juan Alighieri, Argentine film actor

== See also ==
- Alighiero, surname and given name
- Teatro Comunale Alighieri, opera house in Ravenna, Italy
