= Alighiero Guglielmi =

Italian racewalker

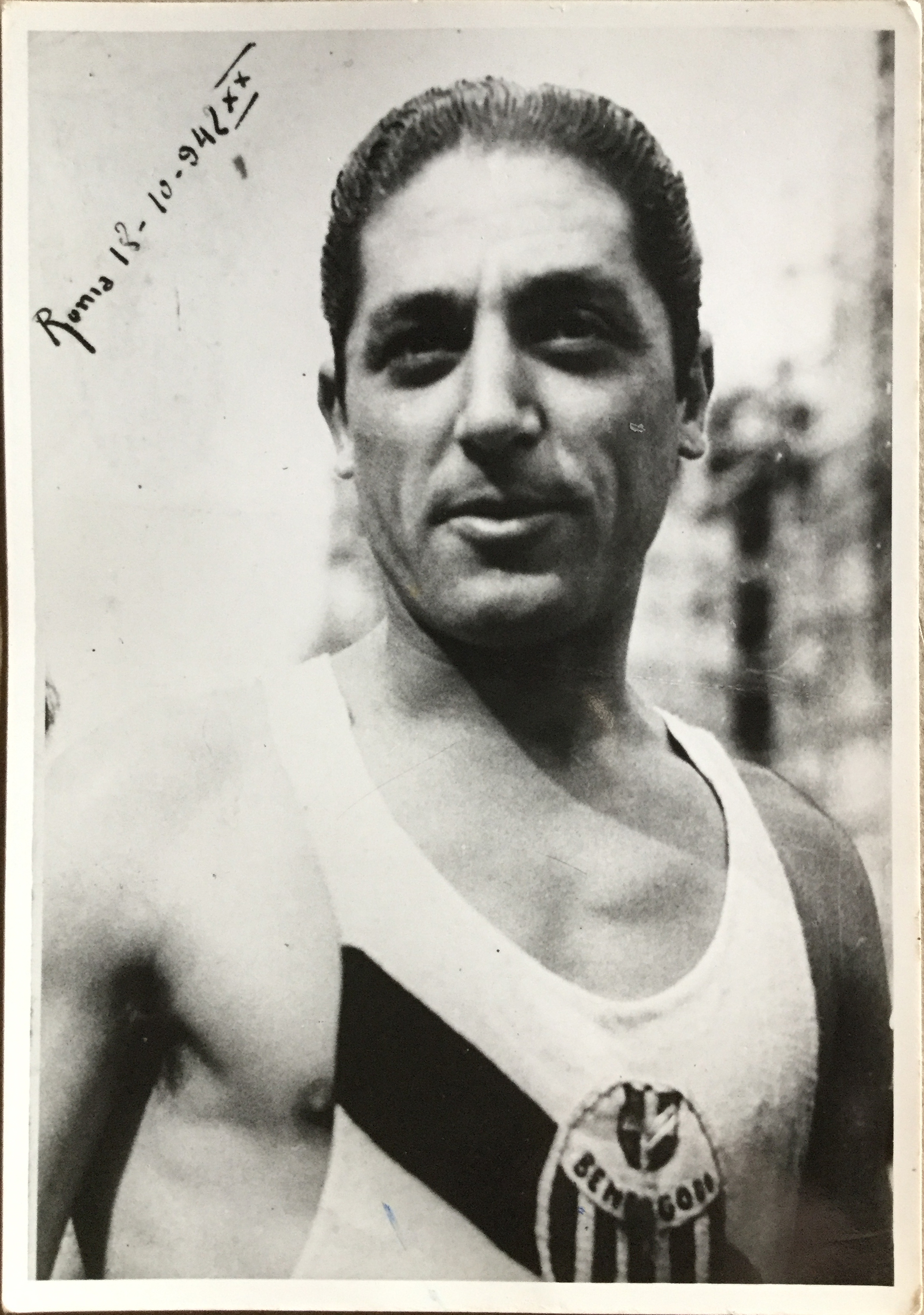
- Guglielmi in 1942.

Personal information
- National team: Italy national athletics team: 1 cap (1947)
- Born: 15 August 1912 Alessandria, Italy
- Died: 1988 (aged 75–76) Calolziocorte, Italy

Sport
- Sport: Athletics
- Event: Racewalking
- Club: I.C. Bentegodi Verona
- Retired: 1955

Achievements and titles
- Personal best: 50 km: 4:48:22 (1947)

Alighiero Guglielmi (15 August 1912 – 1988) was an Italian racewalker.

== Biography ==
Guglielmi was one of the most celebrated Italian racewalkers of the 1940s. Several times winner of the grueling 100 km walk, one of the most famous competition of the racewalking at the time. He did not participate in the Olympic Games only due to World War II, because those of Tokyo 1940 were suppressed, while at the time of Helsinki 1952 he was close to retirement at the age of 40.

== National titles ==
Guglielmi won two titles at the national championships at individual senior level.

- Italian Athletics Championships
  - 50 km walk: 1940, 1942
