= Igor Avrunin =

Israeli athlete (1957–2020)

Personal information
- Native name: Игорь Аврунин
- Citizenship: Soviet Union; Israel
- Born: 16 July 1957 Gomel, USSR
- Died: 7 January 2020 (aged 62) Ashdod, Israel
- Height: 1.94 m (6 ft 4 in)
- Weight: 125 kg (276 lb)

Sport
- Sport: Shot put Discus throw
- Club: Dinamo Kaunas; Maccabi Tel Aviv

Achievements and titles
- Personal bests: discus throw: 62.24 meters (1991); shot put: 19.09 meters (1991)
- Updated on December 30, 2023

Igor Avrunin (sometimes spelled Igor Avronin; Russian: Игорь Аврунин; 16 July 1957 – 7 January 2020) was a USSR-born Israeli track and field athlete.

== Early life ==
Igor Avrunin was born in 1957 in Gomel into a Jewish family. His father was a college physical education teacher and played a significant role in fostering and developing his son's athletic abilities. Avrunin's sports career began in the Youth Sports School of the Olympic Reserve. After graduating from the college in Gomel, he relocated to Kaunas, Lithuania, where he participated in various track and field competitions, and achieved multiple champion titles in the Lithuanian track and field championships.

== Sport career ==
=== Dinamo Kaunas ===
Avrunin trained under the guidance of the coach Rimantas Plungė, representing Dinamo Kaunas team. He won gold medals in discus throw (62 m 96 cm) and shot put (20 m 40 cm) at the 1984 championships in Klaipėda. In 1980, he became the Lithuanian discus throw champion, and in 1981 and 1983, he was the shot put vice-champion. On August 25, 1983, in Kyiv, he set a personal record in shot put – 20 m 68 cm. In 1984, in Smalininkai, he improved the Lithuanian discus throw record to 67 m 14 cm. His competitors during that period included Romas Ubartas, Vaclovas Kidykas in discus throw, and Saulius Kleiza in shot put. Avrunin was awarded by the title of Master of Sports of the USSR, International Class.

=== Maccabi Tel Aviv ===
In 1990, Igor Avruninas repatriated to Israel, marking a significant shift in his athletic journey. The transition did not hinder his achievements, as he continued to leave a lasting impact on Israeli track and field.

He set Israeli record in the men's discus throw on 1 June 1991 at 62.24 m and in the men's shot put on 22 June 1991 at 19.09 m. He is still the current Israeli record holder. His discus throw record in Israel remains unbroken, showcasing the enduring legacy of his achievements.

Avrunin further solidified his position in Israeli track and field, claiming victory in discus throw at the Israeli Championship in 1991 and 1992. Additionally, he secured first place in shot put in 1991, 1992, 1995, and 1996 in various tournaments and competitions.

=== IAAF controversy ===
Igor Avrunin emigrated to Israel in 1990. International Amateur Athletic Federation (IAAF) requires an emigrating citizen to live for three years in a new country before competing in international tournaments. However, the president of the Soviet track and field federation, Igor Ter-Ovanesyan, signed an agreement that allowed recent Soviet emigres to Israel to compete after just one year of residence.

The agreement enabled Israel to add three athletes — Igor Avrunin in the shot-put and discus, Vadim Bavikin in the javelin and Vladimir Ostrovskiy in the 20-kilometer walk — to its team of Rogel Nachum (men's triple jump) and Orit Kolodni (women's 200 and 400 meters).

Thanks to this agreement Avrunin was able to participate at 1991 World Championship in Tokyo and the 1991 IAAF World Indoor Championships in Seville, Spain.

== Post-athletic career ==
After retiring from professional sports, Avrunin pursued taught mathematics and physics, worked in a metal processing factory for four years, and later became a software engineer. He also mentored young discus throwers and shot put athletes.

Avrunin died in Ashdod, at age 62, on 7 January 2020, after a long battle with cancer.

== Personal life ==
Avrunin stood 1.94 m (6 ft 4 1/2 in) tall and weighed 125 kilograms (276 lb) during his active career.

Avrunin's family includes his son, Artur, a basketball player, and his daughter, Angelina, who followed in her father's footsteps to become an accomplished discus thrower.

== See also ==
- List of Israeli records in athletics
