= Yair Garbuz =

Israeli artist (1945–2026)

- יאיר גרבוז
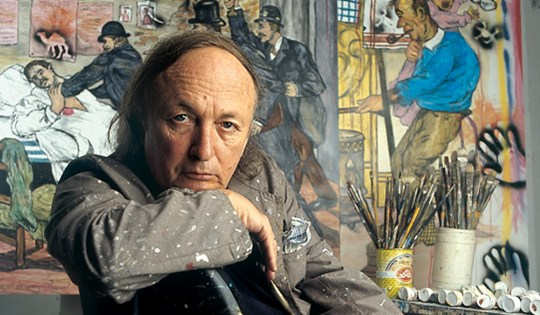
- Born: 29 September 1945; Givatayim, Mandatory Palestine
- Died: 29 April 2026 (aged 80); Ramat Gan, Israel
- Occupations: Visual artist; writer; author; humorist

Yair Garbuz (Hebrew: יאיר גרבוז; 29 September 1945 – 29 April 2026) was an Israeli visual artist, writer, author, humorist and opinion journalist. He was a recipient of the 2004 EMET Prize in painting and was director of the HaMidrasha Art School at Beit Berl College for 12 years.

== Early life and education ==
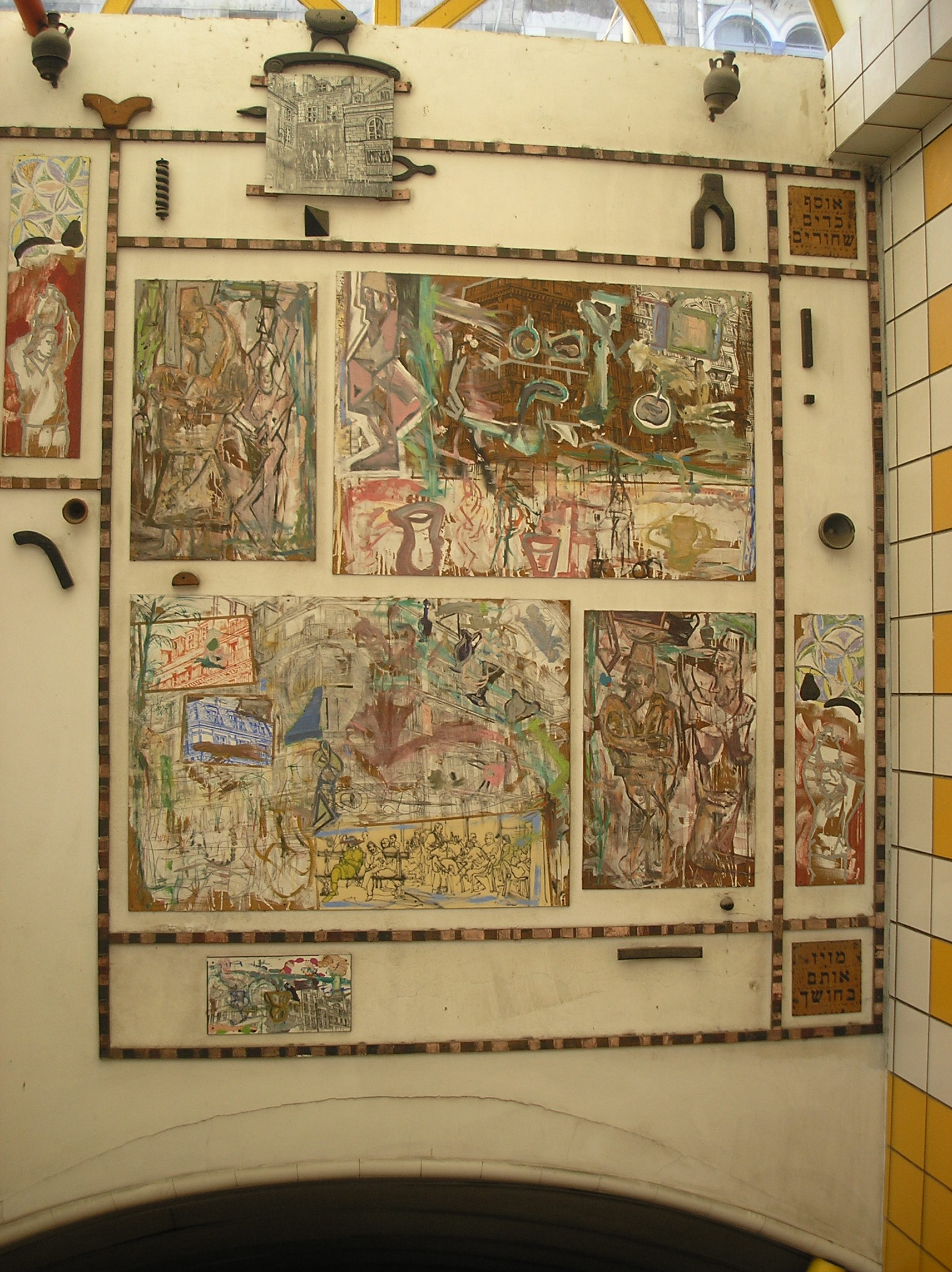
Yair Garbuz mural, Carmelit station, Haifa

Yair Garbuz was born in Givatayim, Mandatory Palestine on September 29, 1945. His parents were immigrants from Poland. His siblings included Aharon Harel, who went on to serve as a member of the Knesset from 1981 to 1988, and Alon Garbuz, the manager of the Tel Aviv Cinematheque.

From 1962 to 1967, while a member of Kibbutz Kfar HaHoresh, he studied painting under Raffi Lavie. He also attended the Avni Institute of Art and Design in Tel Aviv.

== Career ==
From his debut exhibition in 1967, Garbuz's artwork, which included paintings and collage work, appeared in dozens of one-man shows and group exhibitions in Israel and abroad.

In the 1970s Garbuz worked in a variety of media, from installations to artist's books containing political commentary and self-parody. He often referenced other artists and employed visual and verbal jokes. More specifically, he wrote satirical cultural commentaries for Davar Aher, a supplement to the Hebrew-language newspaper Davar, using the alias Y. Polani. On Israeli television, he hosted a satirical show on Channel 2 and appeared as a cultural panelist on Channel 8.

Gabruz was also an educator. From 1973 to 2009, Garbuz taught at "HaMidrasha" art faculty, Beit Berl College, which he directed from 1997. He also taught at the Avni Institute, Tel-Hai Academic College, and the Bezalel Academy of Art and Design in Jerusalem. He became the Cultural Director of Basis for Art & Culture, an art school in Herzliya, in 2015.

== Death ==
Garbuz died on 29 April 2026, at the age of 80, as a result of a prolonged illness.

== Awards and recognition ==
Garbuz was described as "adept in the poetics of loneliness, constantly lighting fires that signal from one mountaintop to the next an ironic wish to belong."

- Sokolov Prize for journalism (1993)
- Kugel Prize for literature, awarded by the Municipality of Holon (2001)
- Emet Prize (2004)

== Published works ==
- Always Polish (1989)
- A House in the Galilee (2014)
- Expected Changes in My Distant Past (2020)
- Terribly Beautiful (2025)

== See also ==
- Visual arts in Israel
