= Maccabi Rishon LeZion =

Maccabi Rishon LeZion מכבי ראשון לציון
- Company type: Maccabi
- Genre: Sports
- Headquarters: Rishon LeZion, Israel

Maccabi Rishon LeZion is a sport club in Rishon LeZion, Israel.

The professional teams associated with it include:

- Maccabi Rishon LeZion (basketball)
- Maccabi Rishon LeZion (handball)
- Maccabi Rishon LeZion (badminton)

There was also a football section, Maccabi Rishon LeZion F.C., which is now defunct.

== Notable members ==
- Diana Vaisman (born 1998), Belarusian-born Israeli sprinter, national record holder in the 100 metre sprint
- Irina Lenskiy, Olympic runner who specializes in the 100 metres hurdles
