= Basis for Art & Culture =

Art school in Herzliya, Israel

Coordinates: 32.1675°N 34.8135°E

- בסיס לאמנות ותרבות
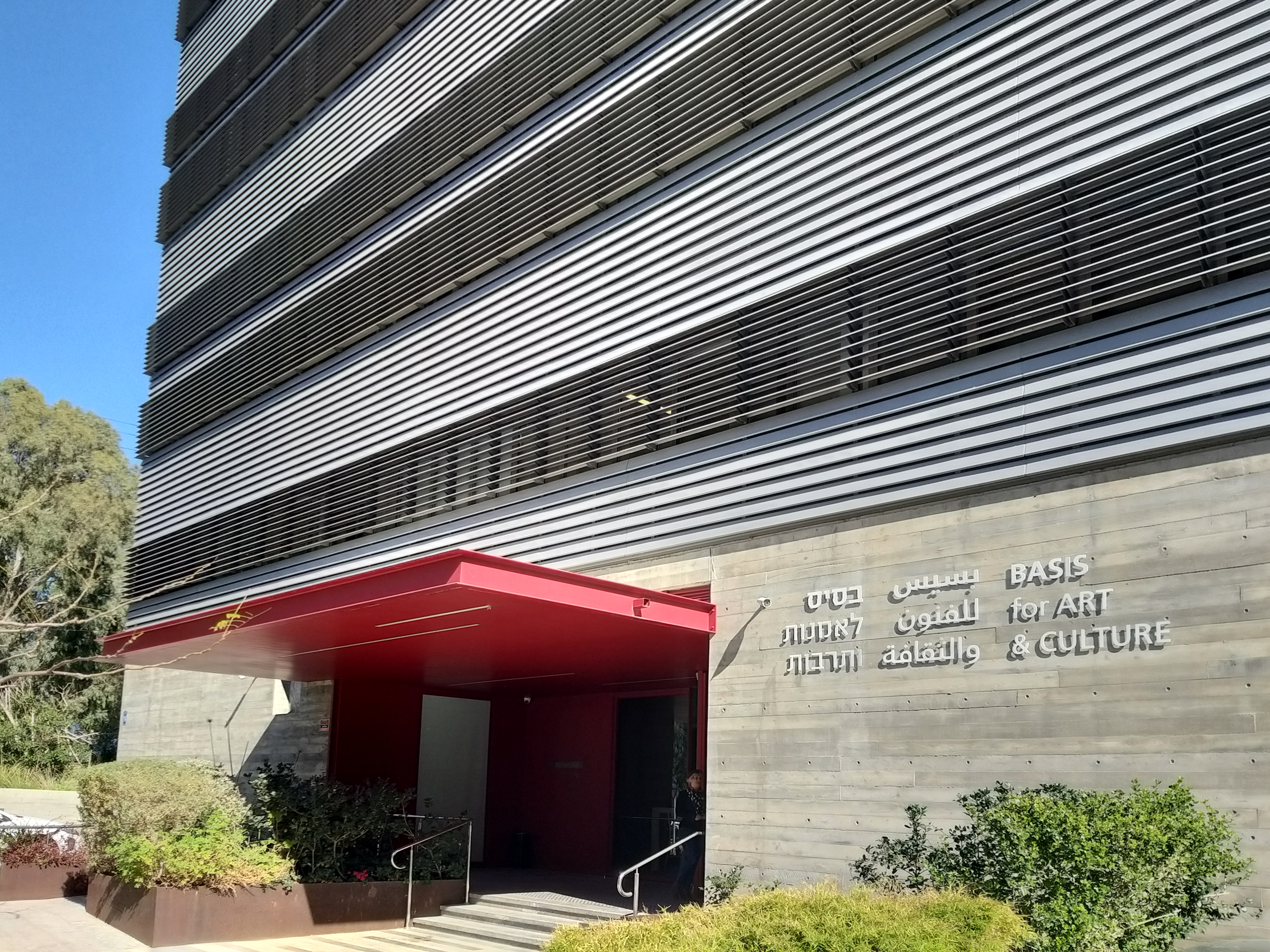
- The entrance to the school building
- Established: 1993
- Location: Herzliya, Israel

The Basis for Art & Culture is an art school in Herzliya, Israel.

The college was founded in 1993 by the sculptor David Zundelovitch, initially as a school of sculpture. In 2000 its management was transferred to a nonprofit organization. It is headed by Ya'acov Dorchin as Artistic Director and Yair Garbuz as Cultural Director.

The school is recognized by the Ministry of Education, and holds an independent four-year curriculum in sculpture, painting and photography. The school is structured as an artists' community serving as a home to teachers who also engage in creative art activities. The school students may observe and engage directly with their teachers' work processes, and are also exposed to the work of guest artists and to exhibitions at the school gallery. The school approach combines traditional approaches with contemporary art, group studies with individual work. It emphasizes workshop and laboratory activities, encouraging a trial and error approach.

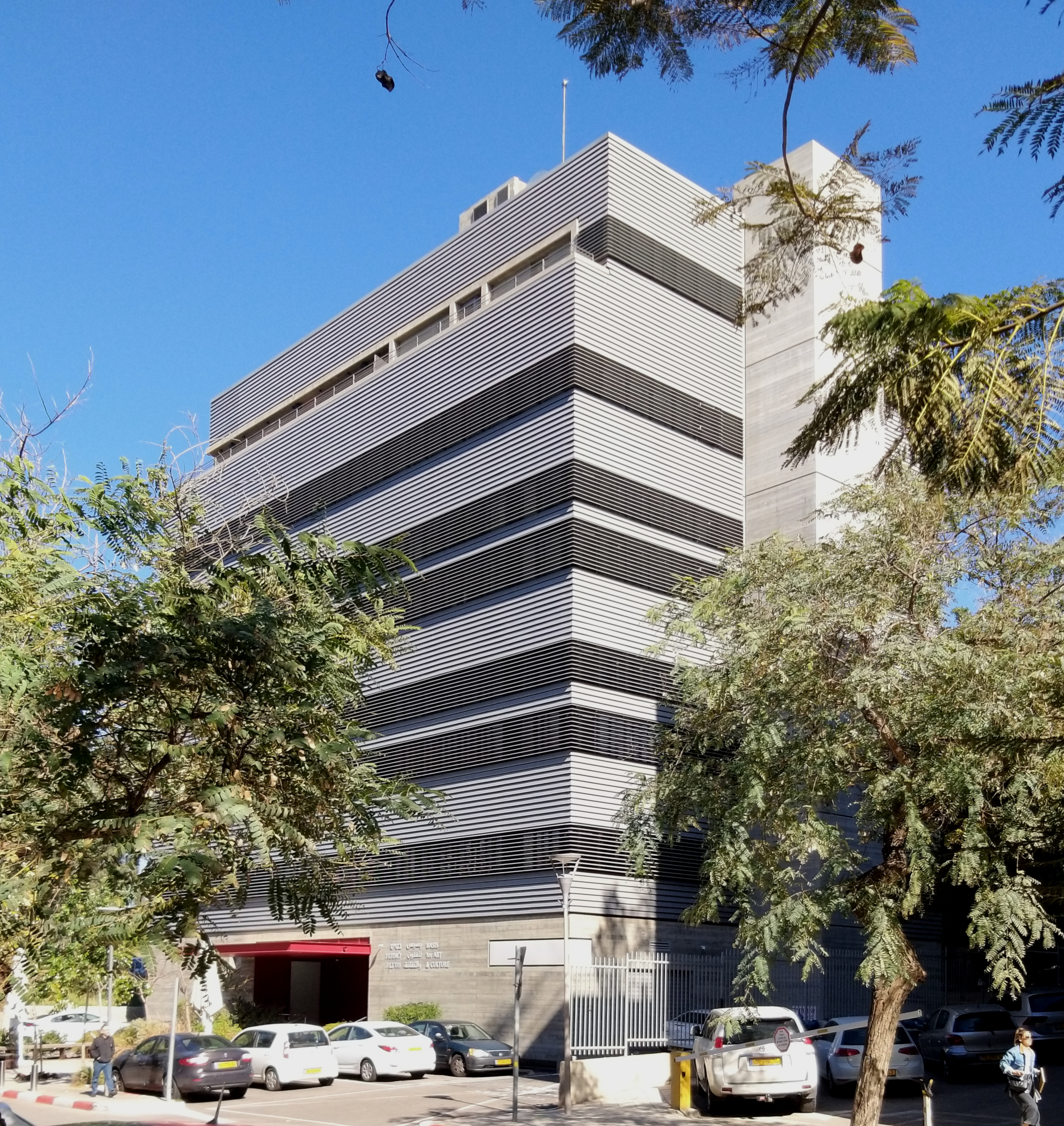
A general view of the school building

The school was originally located at Hadassah Neurim, and moved to Herzliya in 2015.

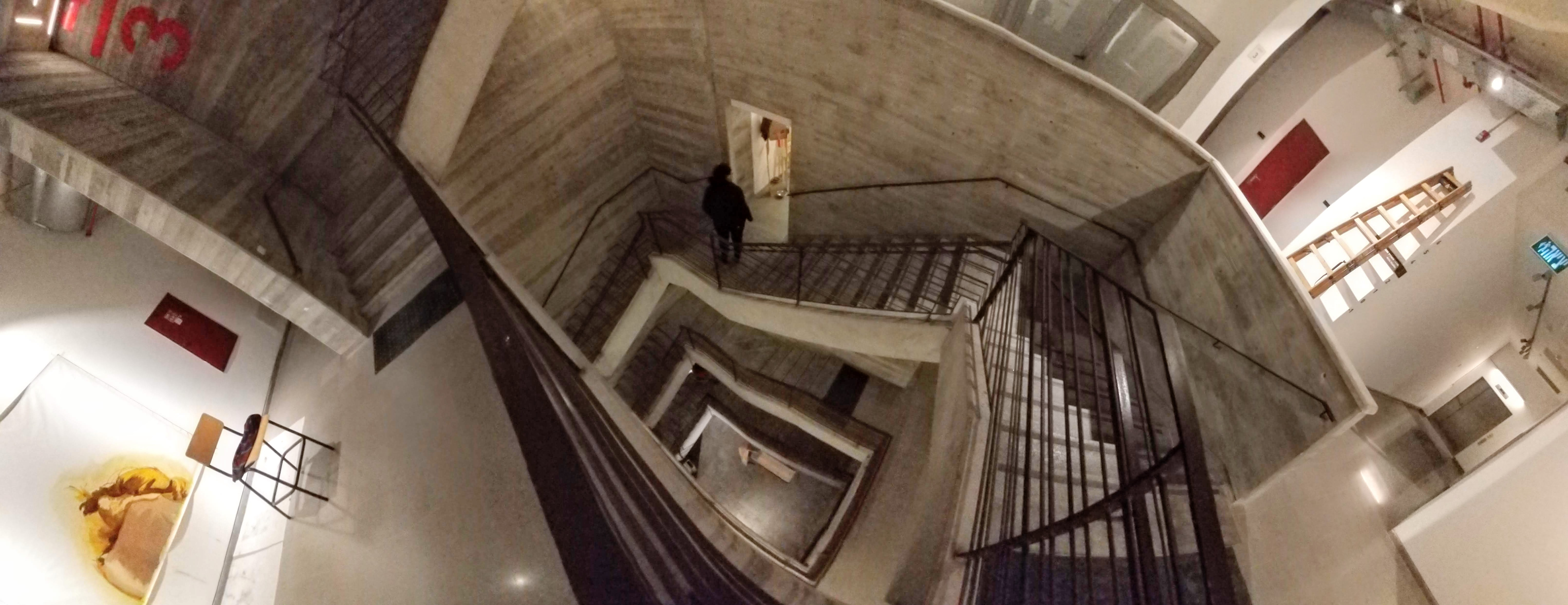
The stairwell of the school building – a panoramic photograph from the 3rd floor
