= Alighiero =

Alighiero is both a surname and given name. Notable people with the name include:

== Given name ==
- Alighiero di Bellincione (c. 1210–1283), father of Dante Alighieri
- Alighiero Boetti (1940–1994), Italian conceptual artist
- Italo Alighiero Chiusano (1926–1995), Italian independent writer, literary critic, Germanist, literary historian, essayist, author of dramas, and journalist
- Alighiero Guglielmi (1912–1988), Italian racewalker
- Alighiero Noschese (1932–1979), Italian comedian

== Surname ==
- Carlo Alighiero (1927–2021), Italian actor, director, and playwright

== See also ==
- Dante Alighieri (1265–1321), Italian poet, writer, and philosopher
