= 50 miles race walk =

Racewalking event

Athletics 50-mile walk
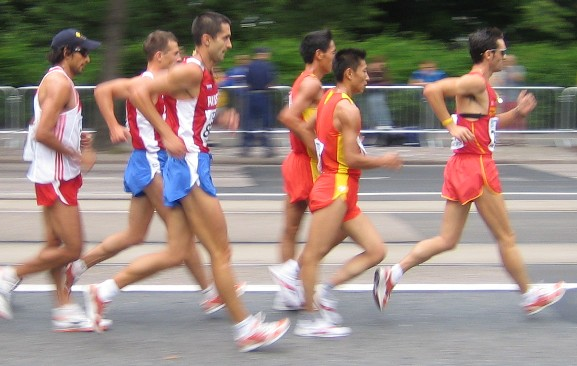
- Men's racewalk. Walker at right appears to be illegal in that both feet are off the ground, but an infraction is only committed when loss of contact is visible to the human eye.

World records
- Men: (Israel) Shaul Ladany 7:23:50 (1972)

The 50-mile race walk is a racewalking event. The event is competed as a road race. See Kennedy march for the 50-mile walk started a fitness challenge.

Athletes must always keep in contact with the ground and the supporting leg must remain straight until the raised leg passes it. 50 miles is 80.47 kilometers.

== U.S. records ==
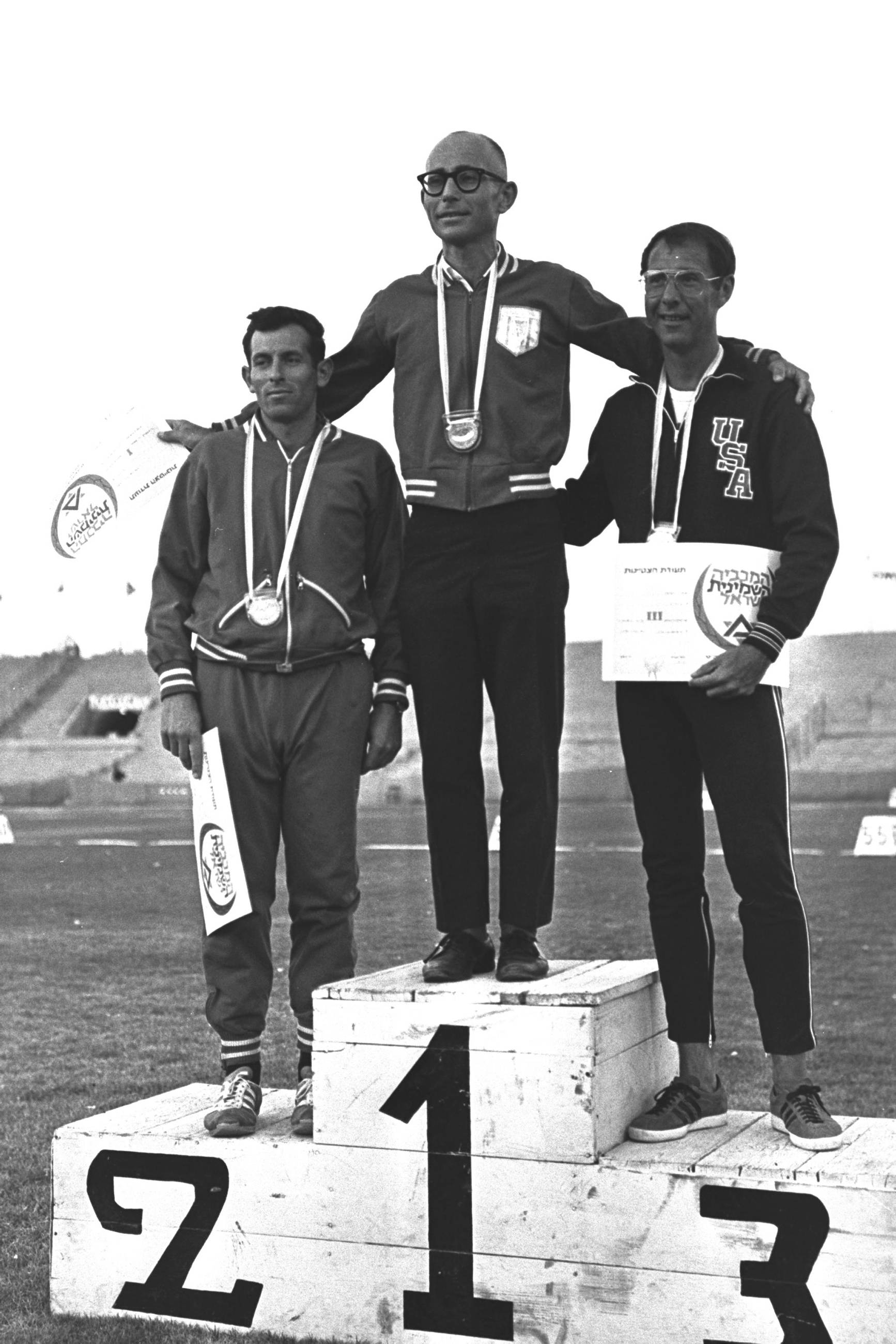
Shaul Ladany (center)

In 1966, Israeli Shaul Ladany broke United States record in the 50-mile walk, which had stood since 1878 and was at the time the oldest U.S. track record.

== World bests ==
The men's world best for the 50-mile race walk is held by Ladany, through his race of 7:23:50 (Note: questionable, 7:44:47.2 by other sources) in 1972 in New Jersey, shattering the world mark that had stood since 1935.
