= 100 kilometres race walk =

Racewalking event

Athletics 100-kilometer walk
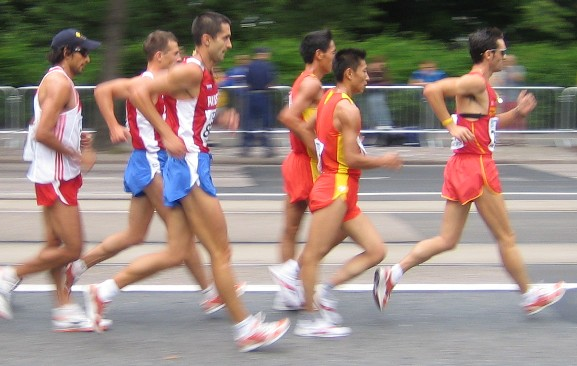
- Men's racewalk. Walker at right appears to be illegal in that both feet are off the ground, but an infraction is only committed when loss of contact is visible to the human eye.

Characteristics
- Category: Racewalking event

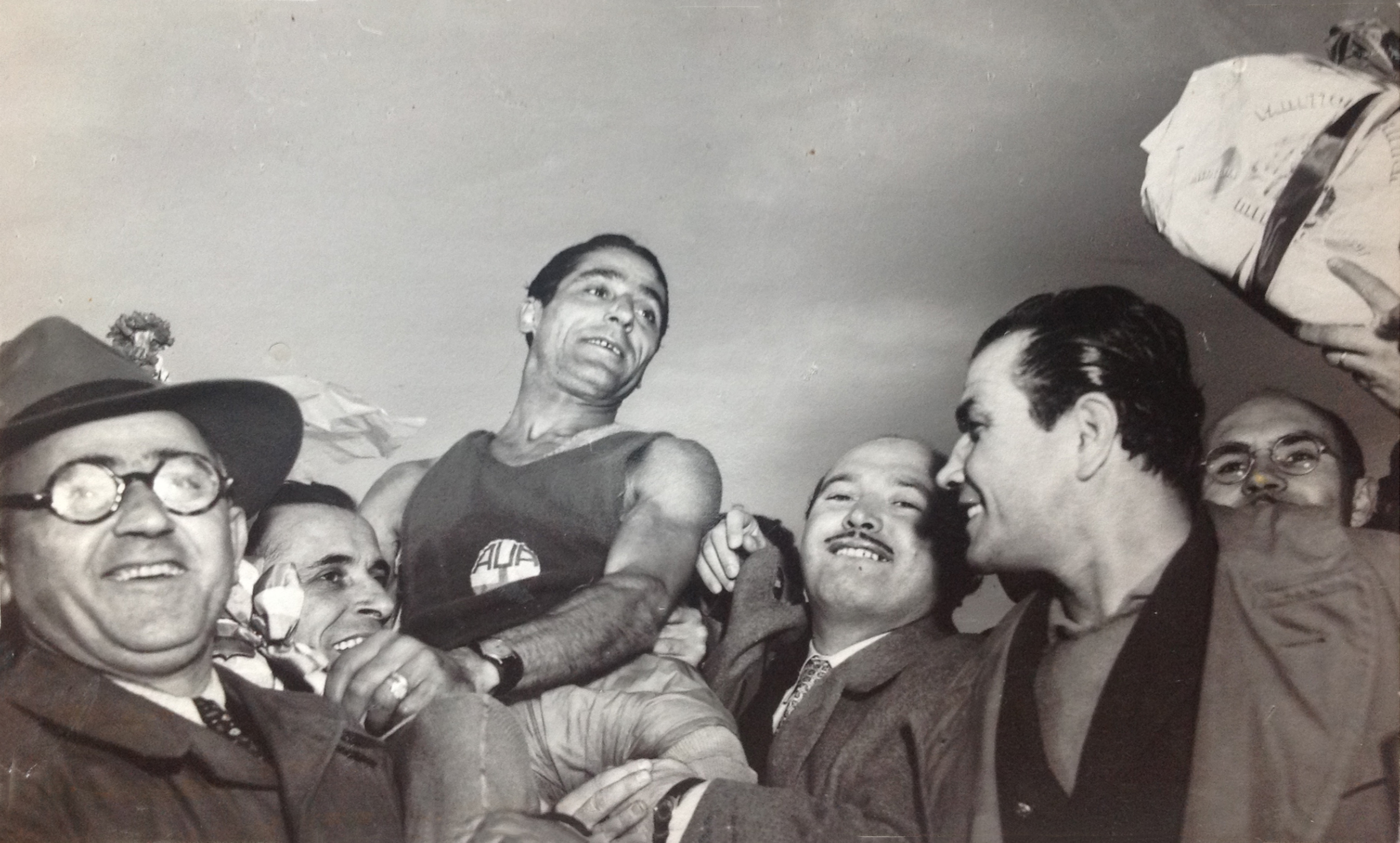
100 km specialist Alighiero Guglielmi, carried in triumph after his third consecutive victory in the 100 km of 1948.

The 100-kilometer race walk is a racewalking event. The event is competed as a road race. Athletes must always keep in contact with the ground and the supporting leg must remain straight until the raised leg passes it.

== History ==
Against the wishes of the Israeli track and field authorities, because the Munich Massacre had just taken place, Israel Shaul Ladany competed and won the gold medal in the World 100 km walking title at the 1972 World Championships in Switzerland, in a time of 9:31:00.

== U.S. record ==
The United States record is 9:36:33, set by Dan Pierce in Houston, Texas, on December 2, 1987.
