= Shaul Ladany =

Israeli racewalker (born 1936)

Shaul Paul Ladany
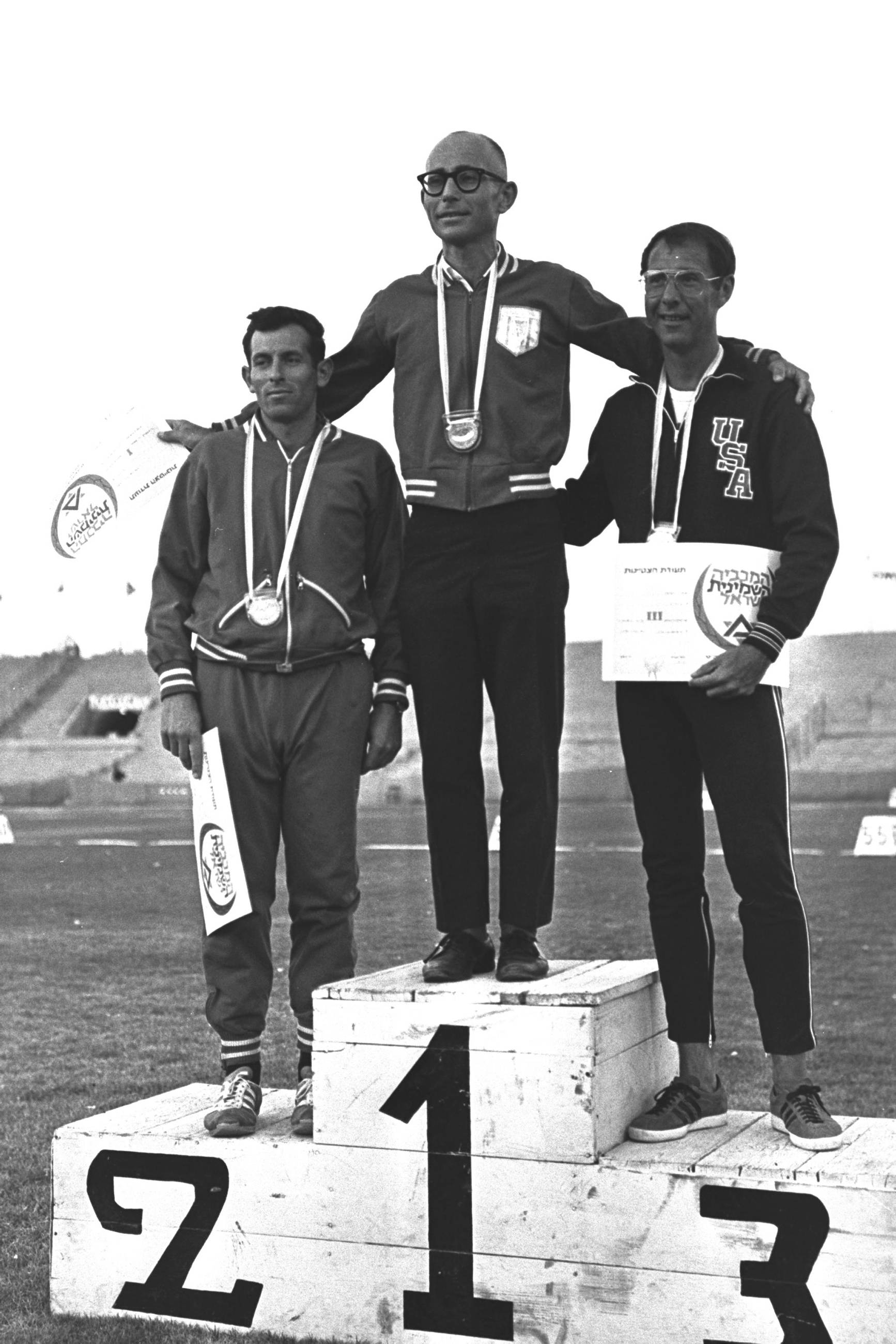
- Shaul Ladany (center), winner of 10-km walk, on podium during 8th Maccabiah Games at Ramat Gan Stadium (1969)

Personal information
- Native name: שאול לדני
- Nationality: Israeli
- Citizenship: Israeli
- Born: April 2, 1936 (age 90) Belgrade, Yugoslavia
- Home town: Omer, Israel
- Education: Technion – Israel Institute of Technology (BSc, Mechanical Engineering, 1960; MSc, 1961); The Hebrew University of Jerusalem (Graduate Diploma, Business Administration, 1964); Columbia University (PhD, Business Administration, 1968)
- Occupations: Professor emeritus of industrial engineering and management
- Employer: Ben-Gurion University of the Negev
- Height: 5 ft 8 in (173 cm)
- Weight: 148 lb (67 kg)
- Shaul Ladany's voice from the BBC programme Saturday Live, March 7, 2009.

Sport
- Sport: Racewalking

Achievements and titles
- World finals: Gold medal in 100-km walk at 1972 World Championships (9:31:00)
- National finals: National Championships: 28 Israeli, 6 U.S., 2 Belgian, 1 Swiss, and 1 South African.
- Highest world ranking: World record in 50-mile walk (7:23:50; 1972–present); Israeli national record in 50-km walk (4:17:06; 1972–present)
- Personal best: 50-km walk: 4:17:06 (1972)
Medal record
Men's athletics
Representing Israel
Olympic Games
	Pierre de Coubertin medal	2007
Maccabiah Games
Gold medal – first place	Israel 1969	3-km walk
Gold medal – first place	Israel 1969	10-km walk
Gold medal – first place	Israel 1969	50-km walk
Gold medal – first place	Israel 1973	20-km walk
Gold medal – first place	Israel 1973	50-km walk
- Updated on February 24, 2013

Shaul Paul Ladany (Hebrew: שאול לדני; born April 2, 1936) is an Israeli Holocaust survivor, racewalker and two-time Olympian. He holds the world record in the 50-mile walk (7:23:50), and the Israeli national record in the 50-kilometer walk (4:17:07). He is a former world champion in the 100-kilometer walk.

Ladany survived the Bergen-Belsen concentration camp in 1944, when he was eight years old. In 1972, he survived the Munich Massacre. He is now a professor of industrial engineering and management at Ben Gurion University, has authored over a dozen books and 120 scholarly papers, and reportedly speaks nine languages. He lives in Omer, Israel.

Asked if it would be fair to call him the ultimate survivor, Ladany laughed and answered: "I don't know about that. What I can say is that in my life there has never been a dull moment."

== Early and family life ==
Ladany was born to a Jewish family in Belgrade, Yugoslavia. He has two sisters, Shosh (two years older) and Marta (five years younger, actually his first cousin, adopted by his parents when she was six months old). He and his wife Shosh were married for 58 years, until her death in 2019, and have a daughter Danit and three grandchildren who live in Modi'in.

== Concentration camp ==
During the Holocaust in Europe, Ladany's maternal grandmother and grandfather were sent to Auschwitz concentration camp, where, Ladany has said, they "were made into soap."

In April 1941, when he was five years old, the Germans attacked Belgrade and the Luftwaffe bombed his home. His parents fled with him to Hungary. There, when he was eight years old they tried to hide him in a monastery for safekeeping, warning him to keep secret the fact that he was Jewish. He was terrified the entire time that he would be discovered, but says that after that experience he wasn't afraid of anything.

In 1944, the eight-year-old was captured by the Nazis with his parents, and shipped to the Bergen-Belsen concentration camp. Many of his family were killed. But in December 1944, he was saved by American Jews who had paid a ransom to have a number of Jews, including him and his parents, released from the concentration camp, where 100,000 Jews had already been killed.

Ladany recalled:

I saw my father beaten by the SS, and I lost most of my family there... A ransom deal that the Americans attempted saved 2,000 Jews and I was one. I actually went into the gas chamber, but was reprieved. God knows why.

Describing the concentration camp, Major Dick Williams, one of the first British soldiers to enter and liberate the camp, said: "It was an evil, filthy place; a hell on Earth." Ladany was one of the few of Yugoslavia's 70,000 Jews who survived the Holocaust. He visits the concentration camp every time he is in Europe. He was also there for the 50th anniversary of liberation, and when a Bergen-Belsen museum was dedicated.

He was brought on the Kastner train from Bergen-Belsen to Switzerland. After the war ended, he and his family moved back to Belgrade. In December 1948, when he was 12 years old, the family emigrated to Israel, which had just become a nation state.

== Education ==
Ladany received his BSc in Mechanical Engineering from the Technion – Israel Institute of Technology in 1960, and an MSc from Technion in 1961. In 1964, he earned a Graduate Diploma in Business Administration from The Hebrew University of Jerusalem. In 1968, he was awarded the PhD in Business Administration by Columbia University, followed by postdoctoral research at Tel Aviv University.

== Competitive walking career ==
=== Early career and Olympics ===
Ladany began his competitive career as a marathon runner in Israel, when he was 18 years old. He later said "in the 1950s, when I started running, people also thought I was a nut. Jews didn't run. They would laugh." He also said that "People thought of it only as punishment for soldiers." In his mid-twenties in the early 1960s, he switched to race walking. Ladany walked his first race in 1962. Commenting on the sport, he said "You need a certain type of mental attitude: a willingness to take punishment, to have a lack of comfort, and pain, to continue and continue. I'm not a psychologist, but was I stubborn, so I entered race walking? Or did I enter race walking, and become stubborn? It's the same in all long-distance events. Quitters don't win, and winners don't quit."

In 1963, he won the first of his 28 Israeli national titles. In 1966, he broke the oldest U.S. track record, which had stood since 1878, in the 50-mile-walk. In April 1968, he again broke the U.S. record in the 50-mile-walk, with a time of 8:05:18 in New Jersey. In 1968, at the age of 32, Ladany competed in his first Olympics – the 1968 Olympics – in the 50-kilometer walk (31 miles, 121 yards) in Mexico City. He finished in 24th place, with a time of 5 hours, 1 minute, and 6 seconds. He trained and competed without a coach.

At the 8th Maccabiah Games in July 1969, he won a gold medal in the 3-km walk (13.35.4). Then at the 1973 Maccabiah Games, he won the 10-km walk and the 50-km walk. In early 1972, Ladany set a world record in the 50-mile walk in a time of 7:44:47, shattering the world mark that had stood since 1935. In April 1972, he lowered his world record to 7:23:50, in New Jersey; a world record time that still stands today. He also holds the Israeli national record in the 50-kilometer walk, at 4:17:07, which he also set in 1972.

In September 1972, he returned as the sole male member of the Israeli track and field team, to compete in the 50-kilometer walk in the 1972 Olympics in Munich, Germany. He said he wanted to show the Germans that a Jew had survived, and he wore a Star of David on his warm-up jersey. When he was congratulated by locals on his fluent German, he responded: "I learned it well when I spent a year at Bergen Belsen". Asked about competing in Germany, the Holocaust survivor said: "I don't say I have to hate Germans. Of course not the younger generation, but I have no special sympathy for the older generation who have been accused of what happened in the Nazi period."

Ladany finished his race in 19th place, with a time of 4 hours, 24 minutes, and 38 seconds. Asked how he felt, he replied: "Arrogant because of what the Germans did to me; proud because I am a Jew". He then returned to the athletes' Olympic Village and went to sleep.

=== Munich massacre ===
In the early hours of September 5, 1972, the Munich massacre began. Eight rifle-carrying Palestinian terrorists, who were members of the Black September faction of the Palestine Liberation Organization, broke into the Israeli quarters in the Olympic Village to take the Israeli Olympic delegation athletes and coaches hostage. The terrorists captured wrestling coach Moshe Weinberg. They shot and killed Weinberg, and threw his body out of a window onto the sidewalk.

Early in the morning somebody wakens me, I open my eyes and that's when my roommate from the Mexico Olympic Games says, 'Get up, Monie was killed by Arab terrorists'. I knew him as a joker but that sounded too serious, so without thinking much, in my pyjamas, I went to the entrance door of the apartment, opened it and looked around. I have seen guards from the village and they were speaking to somebody that was standing in the entrance to apartment number one. I have noticed his dark skin and the hat and I listened, still without being afraid or thinking that something is very dangerous for me, and the guards are asking the permission to let the Red Cross enter apartment one and provide some aid to a wounded person and the man, he refuse. They said, 'Why should you be inhumane?', and the man replied something like either, the Jews or the Israelis 'are not humane either.' At that point I understood that something is going on and I closed the door.

Another team member took Ladany to the window and pointed to the blood stains outside the apartment. They decided to leave the apartment via the rear of their apartment that backed onto a lawn, despite knowing that they would be visible to the terrorists.

The terrorists from the second floor, from apartment number one, had a clear view from the window and we moved out, walked along the lawn without running or zigzagging but in strong and confident legs. Maybe it was stupid? But we had done so....we left the apartment through the lawn.

Surviving terrorist Jamal Al-Gashey revealed that Ladany was spotted racing away from the building leading the terrorists to believe that they were too late to take any hostages in Apartment number two, though several were still inside the apartment. Ladany ran around to the building housing the U.S. team and banged on the ground-floor apartment belonging to the team coaches. He awoke the American track coach Bill Bowerman, who alerted the German police. Bowerman called for the U.S. Marines to come and protect American Jewish Olympians swimmer Mark Spitz and javelin thrower Bill Schmidt. Ladany was the first person to spread the alert as to the attack, and was one of only five Israeli team members to escape. Weinberg and 10 other Israeli Olympic athletes and coaches were kidnapped and killed by the terrorists.

Several television, radio, and newspaper reports listed Ladany as one of those killed. One headline stated: "Ladany Could Not Escape his Fate in Germany for a Second Time". Ladany recalled later:

The impact did not hit me at the time, when we were in Munich. It was when we arrived back in Israel. At the airport in Lod there was a huge crowd – maybe 20,000, people – and each one of us, the survivors, stood by one of the coffins on the runway. Some friends came up to me and tried to kiss me and hug me as if I was almost a ghost that came back alive. It was then that I really grasped what had happened and the emotion hit me.

Three Black September members survived and were arrested at a Munich prison, but the West German authorities decided to release them the following month in exchange for the hostages of hijacked Lufthansa Flight 615 Two of the released Black September members were later killed, as were others who organized the Munich massacre, during a campaign of assassinations by the Israeli Mossad. In 1992, speaking of the massacre, Ladany said: "It's with me all the time, and I remember every detail". He visits the graves of his murdered teammates in Tel Aviv every year, on September 6.

In 2012, the International Olympic Committee decided to not hold a minute of silence before the start of the 2012 Olympic Games, to honor the 11 Israeli Olympians who were killed 40 years prior. Jacques Rogge, the IOC President, said it would be "inappropriate". Speaking of the decision, Ladany commented: "I do not understand. I do not understand, and I do not accept it."

In September 2022 he returned to Munich, Germany for the commemorations of the Israeli deaths, at the Olympic Village and Furstenfeldbruck airfield, where he wore the same Israeli Olympic team blazer he wore in 1972.

=== Later career ===
Ladany returned to competition two months later, against the wishes of the Israeli track and field authorities. The specialist in ultra long distance walking competed in the 1972 World Championships, in Lugano, Switzerland. He won the gold medal in the 100-km walk, in a time of 9:31:00.

At the 1973 Maccabiah Games, he won the 20-km and 50-km walks. In 1976, Ladany set the U.S. record in the 75-kilometer walk for the second year in a row. He became the first person to win both the American Open and American Masters (40 years and over) 75-kilometer walking championships. He repeated the feat in 1977 and 1981 (by which time the event had become a 100-km race).

He won the Israeli national walking championship 28 times from 1963 to 1988. He won the U.S. national walking championship six times (from 1973 to 1981; including the 75-km championships in 1974–77, and the 100-km title in 1974), won the Belgian national walking championship twice (1971 and 1972), won the national walking championship in Switzerland (1972), and won the South Africa national walking championship (1975). His personal best in the 50-kilometer walk is 4:17:06 (1972). He has continued to compete with considerable success at the masters level into his seventies. In 2006, he became the first 70-year-old to walk 100 miles in under 24 hours, setting a world record in Ohio of 21 hours, 45 minutes, 34 seconds.

In 2012, at the age of 75, he was still competing in 35 events a year, and claimed to walk "[...] a minimum of 15 kilometers a day", and participates in "[...] a four-day, 300-kilometer walk from Paris to Tubize, near Brussels."

On every birthday he walks his age in kilometers, so on his birthday in 2012 he went on a 76-km walk in Israel's southern Negev desert. After reaching age 80 he elected to cut the distance, walking half his years to celebrate.

He estimates he has walked 6,000–7,000 miles a year, for a lifetime total of over half a million miles. In his career, Ladany has never had a coach. When asked what he enjoyed most about walking, he answered "Finishing". Ladany completed 83 km on his birthday in 2019, but was unable to do 84 in 2020 due to COVID-19 pandemic.

== Academic career ==
In his academic life, Ladany was a Lecturer of at the Tel Aviv University Graduate School of Business and, for over three decades, a Professor of Industrial Engineering and Management at Ben Gurion University of the Negev, where he was formerly Chairman of the department and is now emeritus professor. He has had visiting appointments at Columbia University, University of California, Irvine, Georgia Tech, Emory University, Rutgers University, Baruch College of the City University of New York, Temple University, University of Cape Town, Science Center Berlin, Singapore University, and CSIRO (Melbourne).

He focuses on quality control and applied statistics. He has also authored over a dozen scholarly books and 110 scientific articles. He holds U.S. patents for eight mechanical designs.

== Philately ==
Ladany is a philatelist. His collection of telegraph stamps and associated material was sold by Spink & Son in Lugano in 2015.

== Autobiography ==
In 1997, his autobiography was published in Hebrew, entitled The Walk to the Olympics. In 2008, it was published in English, entitled King of the Road: The Autobiography of an Israeli Scientist and a World Record-Holding Race Walker (Gefen Publishing). In 2012, a biography was written about him in Italian by Andrea Schiavon, and published under the title: Cinque cerchi e una stella – Shaul Ladany, da Bergen-Belsen a Monaco '72 (ADD Editore, Torino).

== Hall of fame and awards ==
In 2007, Ladany was awarded the Pierre de Coubertin Medal for outstanding service to the Olympic Movement. He was cited as a special person with "unusual outstanding sports achievements during a span covering over four decades."

Ladany said he would set up a 10,000₪ Olympic race-walking fund, and offer 1,000₪ to any Israeli who can complete the 50-kilometer race in less than five hours.

In 2008, the Israeli Industrial Engineering Association awarded Ladany with its Life Achievement award. He was inducted into the International Jewish Sports Hall of Fame in 2012.

In 2023 the Jupiter Trojan asteroid with the temporary designation 2001 UV_{209} was named (247341) Shaulladany.

== Selected publications ==
- The Structure of the Printed Hebrew Language and Its Efficiency in Transmitting Information, by Shaul P. Ladany, Tel Aviv University, Leon Recanati Graduate School of Business Administration (1969)
- The Interaction of Linear Programming and Value Analysis, by Shaul P. Ladany, Tel Aviv University, Leon Recanati Graduate School of Business Administration (1969)
- Graphical Determination of Single Fraction-Defective Sampling Plans for Individual Small Lots, by Shaul P. Ladany, Tel Aviv University, Leon Recanati Graduate School of Business Administration (1970)
- English-Hebrew dictionary of statistical terminology, by Shaul P. Ladany, Israel Institute of Productivity (1970)
- Determination of Optimal Compressed Limit Gaging Sampling Plans, by Shaul P. Ladany, Tel Aviv University, Leon Recanati Graduate School of Business Administration (1971)
- Efficient Sampling by Artificial Attributes, by Avraham Beja and Shaul P. Ladany, Tel Aviv University, Leon Recanati Graduate School of Business Administration (1973–76)
- Optimal Car Rental Policy, by Shaul P. Ladany, Columbia University, Graduate School of Business (1974)
- Management science in sports, Robert Engel Machol and Shaul P. Ladany, North Holland Pub. Co. (1976)
- Optimal strategies in sports, by Shaul P. Ladany and Robert Engel Machol, North Holland Pub. Co. (1977)
- Optimal Segmentation of Walls Built on Slopes, by Shaul P. Ladany, Internat. Inst. für Management und Verwaltung (1978)
- Optimal Hotel Room Pricing Policy, by Avner Arbel and Shaul P. Ladany, School of Hotel Administration, Cornell University (1986)
- Optimal Cruise-liner Passenger Cabin Pricing Policy, by Avner Arbel and Shaul P. Ladany, School of Hotel Administration, Cornell University (1990)
- King of the Road: The Autobiography of an Israeli Scientist and a World Record-Holding Race Walker, by Shaul P. Ladany, Gefen Publishing (2008)

=== Philately ===
- Maximization of Revenue from Sale of United Nations Postage-stamps for Philatelic Purposes, by Shaul P. Ladany, Columbia university, 1968
- Greeting Telegrams of the Jewish National Fund, by Shaul P. Ladany, Society of Israel Philatelists Educational Fund (1995)

== See also ==
- List of world records in athletics
- List of select Jewish track and field athletes
- List of Israeli records in athletics

Records
Preceded by. (1935)	Men's 50-Mile Walk World Record Holder; April 1972 – present	Succeeded by incumbent
