= Hadassah Neurim =

Hadassah Neurim: הדסה נעורים (Hebrew)
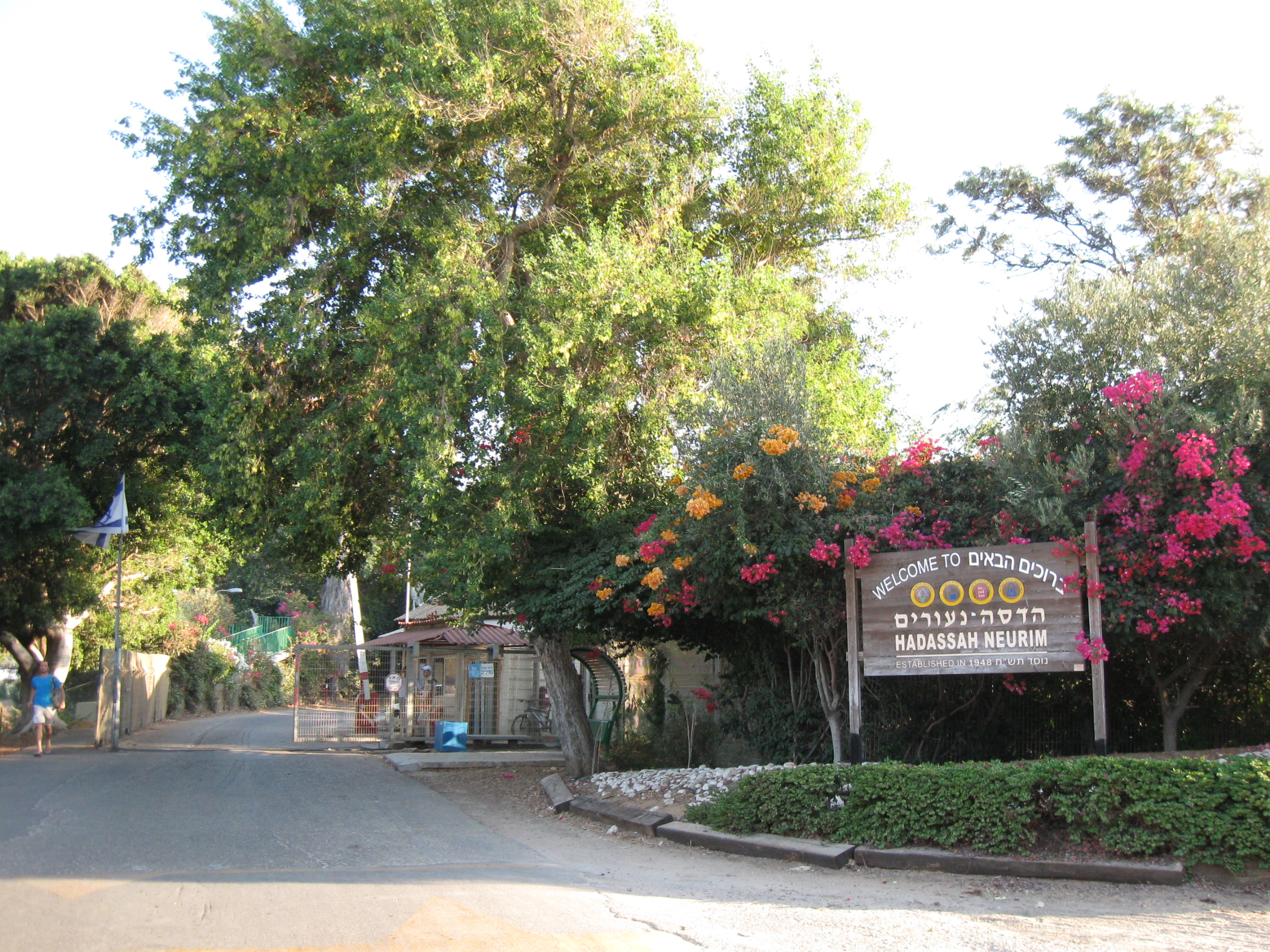

- Location within Central Israel
- Coordinates: 32°22′27″N 34°51′43″E
- Country: Israel
- District: Central
- Subdistrict: HaSharon
- Council: Hefer Valley
- Founded: 1948
- Population (2024): 207

Hadassah Neurim (Hebrew: הדסה נעורים) is a youth village in central Israel. Located on the coast to the north of Netanya, it falls under the jurisdiction of Hefer Valley Regional Council. In 2024 it had a population of 207.

== History ==
The village was established in 1948. The village runs specialist programmes for children with special needs and children with sporting abilities.

During summers, when the students go home, the village is used by various youth groups to host summer camps. The village was also the location of the Basis art school between 2004 and 2013.
