= Kennedy march =

Long-distance march of 50 miles

A Kennedy march is a long-distance march of 50 miles (80 km), named after former American president John F. Kennedy.

== Origin ==
John F. Kennedy came into office with a goal of improving the health of the nation as part of his New Frontier policy program. As President-elect, he wrote an article for Sports Illustrated, December 26, 1960, called "The Soft American" which warned that Americans were becoming unfit in a changing world where automation and increased leisure time replaced the benefits of exercise and hard work.

“A single look at the packed parking lot of the average high school will tell us what has happened to the traditional hike to school that helped to build young bodies. The television set, the movies and the myriad conveniences and distractions of modern life all lure our young people away from the strenuous physical activity that is the basis of fitness in youth and in later life,” wrote Kennedy.

President Kennedy addressed the issue of physical fitness frequently in his public pronouncements, and assigned new projects to the President's Council on Physical Fitness and Sports, an organization established by Kennedy's predecessor Eisenhower on July 16, 1956.

The idea of a 50-mile, twenty hour march developed from Kennedy's discovery in late 1962 of an executive order from Theodore Roosevelt, which challenged U.S. Marine officers to finish 50 miles (80 km) in twenty hours, spread out over a maximum of three days. Kennedy passed the document on to his own Marine commandant, General David M. Shoup, and suggested that Shoup bring it up to him as his own discovery, with the proposal that modern day Marines should duplicate this feat. The President went on to say that:

Should your report to me indicate that the strength and stamina of the modern Marine is at least equivalent to that of his antecedents, I will then ask Mr. Salinger to look into the matter personally and give me a report on the fitness of the White House Staff.

In his conversations with his press secretary, Pierre Salinger, Kennedy left no doubt that "look[ing] into the matter personally" would involve Salinger walking fifty miles himself. A well-padded individual with a sense of humor about himself, Salinger turned his efforts to avoid the march into an open joke, finally releasing a statement on February 12, 1963, in which he publicly declined the honor. As justification, Salinger pointed to Attorney General Robert F. Kennedy's completion of the march as proof of the fitness of the administration. The President's brother had undertaken the march on an impulse, and although clad in leather oxford shoes, had slogged the distance through snow and slush.

But the real impact of the fifty mile march was with the public at large, which took it as a personal request and a challenge from their President. Furthermore, responsibility for the President's challenge was presumed to lie with the President's Council. This put the council in a tricky position. To disavow the marches would undermine its declared purposes. On the other hand, the council wanted no part of having the marches thrust on it as a program by an overenthusiastic public. As a compromise, the council sent out a cautious press release recommending a moderate, gradual program of walking for exercise. For the more persistent, the council prepared a background letter explaining the origin of the march, again suggesting a sensible walking regimen, and stating emphatically that government agencies were not sponsoring or rewarding hikes.

However the Amos Alonzo Stagg Foundation did present Bronze medals to those who completed the 50-mile (80 km) hike in less than 12 hours during the initial 30 days of the challenge.

== Kennedy March Sittard ==
The Kennedy-Mars Sittard is the oldest Kennedy March of the Netherlands.

=== History ===
The Kennedy march became a fad in the UK shortly after American people took up Kennedy's challenge. After Dutch television showed images of the Kennedy march craze, some Dutch people decided to make an attempt at finishing the 80 kilometers within 20 hours.

In the city of Sittard, situated in the most southern province of the Netherlands, four young people decided to walk the march during their Easter holidays. April 20, 1963, they began their route with 7 friends, beginning and ending in Sittard and covering pieces of Germany and Belgium. One girl took a bus in the German town of Heinsberg, but the other 3 girls and 7 boys persisted and finished in 19 hours' time. They decided immediately to try to do the march one year after and thus a tradition was born.

=== Statistics ===
The number of participants grew over the years, with a peak in 1989 when 7090 people enrolled. Having 3062 participants in 2009, the Kennedy March of Sittard is still the biggest long-distance hike (that is, a hike of more than 59 kilometers) of the Netherlands. Due to the risk of spreading foot-and-mouth disease, the march was cancelled in 2001. In 2020 and 2021 the march was cancelled due to the COVID-19 pandemic, so including 2022 the march has been organised 57 times.

=== Organisation ===
The Kennedy March of Sittard has been, and still is, organised largely by members of the Van der Loo family, one of whom was one of the four men who initiated the idea in 1963.

== Other Kennedy Marches ==
=== Netherlands ===
In the Netherlands, about 26 Kennedy Marches take place every year. After the aforementioned Kennedy March Sittard, the Kennedymars Someren and the 80 van de Langstraat are the biggest events in terms of the number of participants.

=== Belgium ===
On 9 September 2023, Belgium will have its first Kennedy March in 40 years.
