= Irina Lenskiy =

Ukrainian-born Israeli athlete (born 1971)

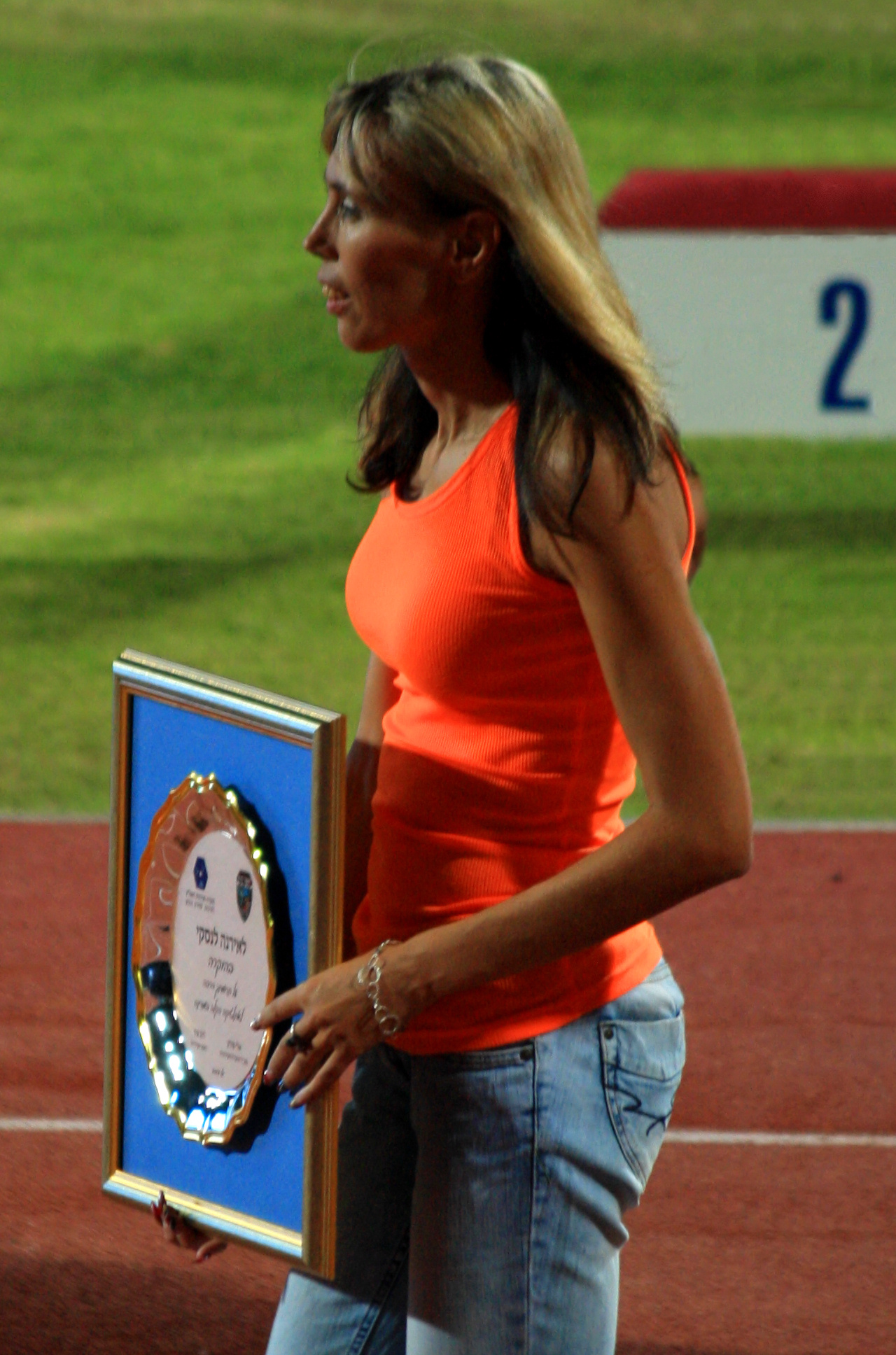
- Irina Lenskiy in 2013

Personal information
- Nationality: Israel
- Born: אירנה לנסקי; June 12, 1971 (age 55) Ukrainian SSR, Soviet Union

Sport
- Sport: Athletics
- Event: 100 metres hurdles

Achievements and titles
- Personal bests: 100 metres hurdles: 12.80 seconds (2002); 60 metres hurdles: 8.03 seconds (2002); 100 metres: 11.59 seconds (2003); 200 metres: 23.15 seconds (2002); 400 metres: 52.60 seconds (1997); 400 metres hurdles: 55.69 seconds (1996)

Irina Lenskiy (Hebrew: אירנה לנסקי; born 12 June 1971) is a Ukrainian-born Israeli athlete who specializes in the 100 metres hurdles.

== Personal life ==
She is of Jewish background, and was a Ukrainian citizen, known as Irina Lenskaya, until 1999 when she emigrated to Israel. She also held the surname Omelchenko for a period.

In Israel she represents the sports club Maccabi Rishon LeZion. She stands 1.76 m (5 ft 9 1/2 in) tall and weighed about 126 pounds (57 kg) during her active career. Her daughter Olga Lenskiy (born 1992) competed in sprints at the 2009 World Youth Championships.

== Career ==
By the time of migrating to Israel she had already taken part in the 1995 and 1997 World Championships, both in the 400 metres hurdles. Her personal best time was 55.69 seconds, achieved in June 1996 in Kyiv, and she also had 52.60 seconds in the 400 metres, achieved in 1997.

In the short hurdles distances (100 and 60 metres) she competed at the 2001 World Indoor Championships, the 2001 World Championships, the 2002 European Indoor Championships, the 2002 European Championships, the 2003 World Championships, the 2004 Olympic Games, the 2006 European Championships and the 2009 World Championships without reaching the final. In the 4 x 400 metres relay she competed at the 2003 World Championships without reaching the final.

Her personal best times are 8.03 seconds in the 60 metres hurdles, achieved in January 2002 in Moscow; and 12.80 seconds in the 100 metres hurdles, achieved in July 2002 in Rethimno. She also has 11.59 seconds in the 100 metres, achieved in May 2003 in Tel Aviv; and 23.15 seconds in the 200 metres, achieved in June 2002 in Belgrade.

== See also ==
- List of Israeli records in athletics
- List of Maccabiah records in athletics
