= Race walking =

Athletic discipline

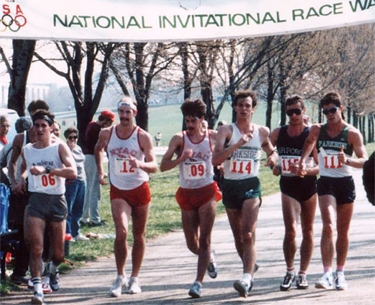
- Race walkers at the U.S. World Cup Trials in 1987

Presence
- Country or region: World
- Olympic: Yes

Race walking, or racewalking, is a long-distance discipline within the sport of athletics. Although a foot race, it is different from running in that one foot must appear to be in contact with the ground at all times. Race judges carefully assess that this is maintained throughout the race. Races are typically held on either roads or running tracks. Common distances range from 3,000 metres (1.9 mi) up to 100 kilometres (62.1 mi).

The current race walking contests at the Summer Olympics are the 20 kilometres race walk (men and women) and the marathon race walk mixed relay, the latter of which debuted at the 2024 Summer Olympics. The 50 kilometres race walk (men only) was discontinued after the 2020 Summer Olympics. The biennial World Athletics Championships also features both 20 and 50 kilometer events, the 50 km walk for women being contested until 2019. The 50 km race walk was replaced by the 35 kilometres race walk as standard championship discipline in 2022. The IAAF World Race Walking Cup, first held in 1961, is a stand-alone global competition for the discipline and it has 10 kilometres race walks for junior athletes, in addition to the Olympic-standard events. The IAAF World Indoor Championships featured 5000 m and 3000 m race walk variations, but these were discontinued after 1993. Top-level athletics championships and games typically feature 20 km racewalking events.

The sport emerged from a British culture of long-distance competitive walking known as pedestrianism, which began to develop the ruleset that is the basis of the modern discipline around the mid-19th century. Since the mid-20th century onwards, Russian and Chinese athletes have been among the most successful on the global stage, with Europe and parts of Latin America producing most of the remaining top-level walkers. However, it has been particularly affected by doping, with many Russian world and Olympic champions testing positive for banned performance-enhancing drugs.

Compared to other forms of foot racing, stride length is reduced; to achieve competitive speeds racewalkers must attain cadence rates comparable to those achieved by running.

== Rules ==
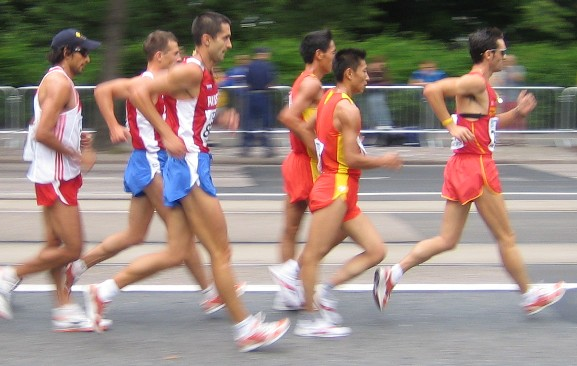
Men's 20 km walk during the 2005 World Championships in Athletics in Helsinki, Finland. The walker at the right appears to be breaking the rules of race walking as both feet are off the ground, but according to the current rules, an infraction is only committed when the loss of contact is visible to the human eye.

There are only two rules that govern race walking. The first dictates that the athlete's back toe cannot leave the ground until the heel of the front foot has touched. Violation of this rule is known as loss of contact. The second rule requires that the supporting leg must straighten from the point of contact with the ground and remain straightened until the body passes directly over it. These rules are judged by the unaided human eye. Athletes regularly lose contact for a few milliseconds per stride, which can be caught on film, but such a short flight phase is said to be undetectable to the human eye.

Athletes stay low to the ground by keeping their arms pumping low, close to their hips. If one sees a racewalker's shoulders rising, it may be a sign that the athlete is losing contact with the ground. What appears to be an exaggerated swivel to the hip is, in fact, a full rotation of the pelvis. Athletes aim to move the pelvis forward and to minimize sideways motion in order to achieve maximum forward propulsion. Speed is achieved by stepping quickly with the aim of rapid turnover. This minimizes the risk of the feet leaving the ground. Strides are short and quick, with pushoff coming forward from the ball of the foot, again to minimize the risk of losing contact with the ground. World-class race walkers (male and female) can average under 4 and 5 minutes per kilometre in a 20 km race walk (12 to 15 kilometers per hour or 7.5 to 9 miles per hour).

== Distances ==
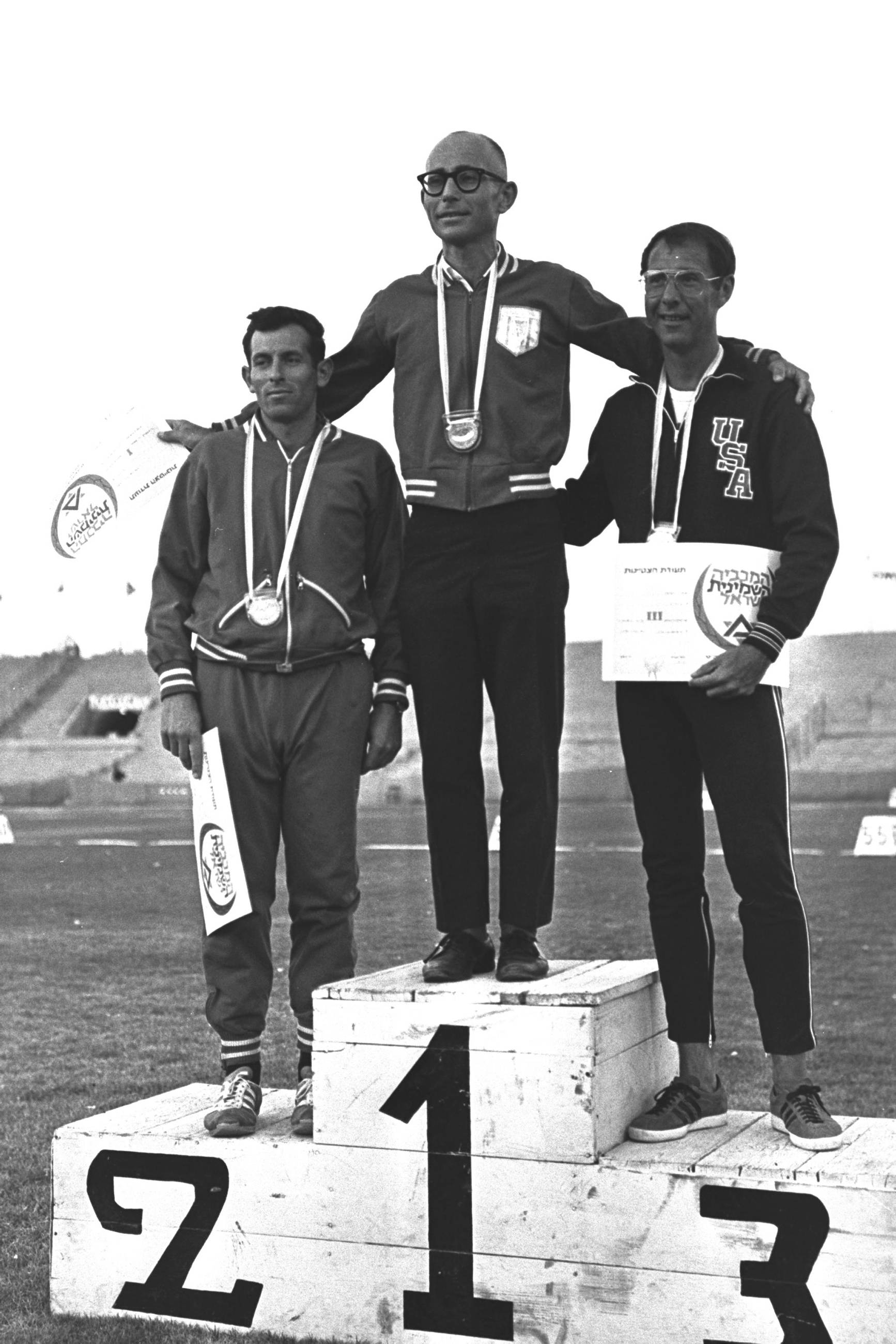
Shaul Ladany (centre), in 1969

Races have been walked at distances as short as 3 kilometres (1.9 mi) at the 1920 Summer Olympics, and as long as 100 km (62.1 mi). The men's world record for the 50-mile race walk is held by Israeli Shaul Ladany, whose time of 7:23:50 in 1972 beat the world record that had stood since 1935. The modern Olympic events are the 20 km (12.4 mi) race walk (men and women) and 50 km (31 mi) race walk (men only). One example of a longer race walking competition is the annual Paris-Colmar which is 450 to 500 km. Indoor races are 3000 m and 5000 m.

== Judges ==
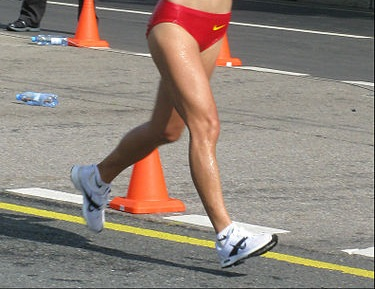
An example of a racewalker in a "flight phase" (both feet entirely out of contact with the ground, a rule violation)

There are judges on the course to monitor the form. Three judges submitting "red cards" for violations results in disqualification of the competitor. There is a scoreboard placed on the course so competitors can see their violation status. If the third violation is received, the chief judge removes the competitor from the course by showing a red paddle. For monitoring reasons, races are held on a looped course or on a track so judges get to see competitors several times during a race. A judge could also "caution" competitors in danger of losing form by showing a paddle that indicates either losing contact or bent knees. No judge may submit more than one card for each walker. The chief judge's job is only to disqualify the offending walker and may not submit any caution cards. Disqualifications are routine at the elite level, such as the famous case of Jane Saville, disqualified within sight of a gold medal in front of her home crowd in the 2000 Summer Olympics, or Lü Xiuzhi, disqualified 20 metres before the finish line at the 2017 World Championships in Athletics.

== Beginning ==
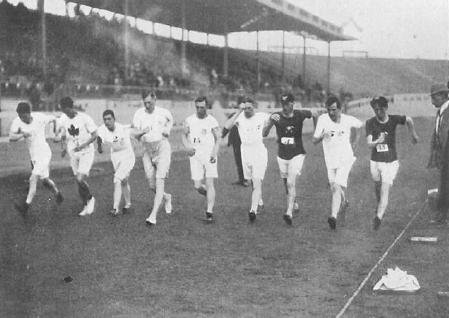
The start of the 3500 m walk final, 1908 Olympics

Race walking developed as one of the original track and field events of the first meeting of the English Amateur Athletics Association in 1880. The first race walking codes came from an attempt to regulate rules for popular 19th-century long-distance competitive walking events, called pedestrianism. Pedestrianism had developed, like footraces and horse racing, as a popular working class British and American pastime, and a venue for wagering. Walkers organised the first English amateur walking championship in 1866, which was won by John Chambers, and judged by the "fair heel and toe" rule. This rather vague code was the basis for the rules codified at the first Championships Meeting in 1880 of the Amateur Athletics Association in England, the birth of modern athletics. With football (soccer), cricket, and other sports codified in the 19th century, the transition from professional pedestrianism to amateur race walking was, while relatively late, part of a process of regularisation occurring in most modern sports at this time.

The Walk was included at the 1876 to 1879 National Association of Amateur Athletes of America Championships.

== Olympics ==
The current race walking contests at the Summer Olympics are the 20 kilometres race walk (men and women) and the marathon race walk mixed relay, the latter of which debuted at the 2024 Summer Olympics. The 50 kilometres race walk (men only) was discontinued after the 2020 Summer Olympics.

Race walking first appeared in the modern Olympics in 1904 in the form of a half-mile (804.672m) walk in the all-round competition, the precursor to the 10-event decathlon. In 1908, stand-alone 1,500m and 3,000m race walks were added, and, excluding 1924, there has been at least one race walk (for men) in every Olympics since.

Women's race walking became an Olympic event in 1992, following years of active lobbying by female internationals.

A World Cup in race walking is held biennially, and race walk events appear in the World Athletics Championships, the Commonwealth Games and the Pan American Games, among others.

== World Athletics Race Walking Tour ==
Since 2003, World Athletics has organised the World Athletics Race Walking Tour, an annual worldwide competition series in which elite athletes accumulate points for the right to compete in the IAAF Race Walking Challenge Final and to share over US$200,000 of prize money. The series of televised events takes place in several countries each year including Mexico, Spain, Russia and China.

== Age groups ==
USA Track & Field offers racewalking at the Youth, Open, All-Comers, and Masters levels.

High School: Racewalking is sometimes included in high school indoor and outdoor track meets, the rules often more relaxed. The distances walked tend to be relatively short, with the 1500 m being the most commonly held event. Racing also occurs at 3 km, 5 km and 10 km, with records kept and annual rankings published.

== As an individual pursuit ==
While participating in races essentially defines race walking, it can be practised by individuals for their own benefit, much like joggers not taking part in racing. One former jogger has written about injuries sustained while running, recommending race walking, which is much easier on the joints, instead. Requiring to have one foot in contact with the ground at all times reduces the impacts on ankles, knees, and hips that lead to running injuries.

== Top performers ==
=== Women ===
==== 50 km ====
The women's 50 km walk is a new event, having been controversially added to the World Athletics Championships for the first time in 2017.
During the World Athletics Council meeting held at Monaco on 3-4 December 2024, World Athletics announced that 20 kilometres race walk would be replaced by half marathon race walk while 35 kilometres race walk (had replaced 50 kilometres race walk in 2021) would be replaced by marathon race walk, both being effective since 1 January 2026.

== In popular culture ==
Despite being one of the original disciplines of modern athletics, racewalking is sometimes derided as a contrived or "artificial" sport. In 1992, noted sportscaster and longtime Olympic commentator Bob Costas compared it to "a contest to see who can whisper the loudest".

In Malcolm in the Middle season 4 episode "Malcolm Holds His Tongue", Hal gets into the sport and exposes his local park rival as "nothing but a common jogger" by proving that both of his feet leave the ground once every fourth step.

In the 1966 film Walk, Don't Run, Jim Hutton plays a racewalker competing in the Tokyo Olympics. Cary Grant and Samantha Eggar co-star.

Irish Olympian John Kelly appears briefly as a racewalker in the 1968 musical film Star!, starring Julie Andrews and Richard Crenna.

In the 2021 film Queenpins, actress Kristen Bell plays a three-time gold medal Olympic racewalker and extreme couponer.

In a local Seattle sketch comedy series Almost Live!, Bill Nye played "Speed Walker", a superhero who fights crime while adhering to the standards of competitive speed-walking.

The 2025 comedy film Racewalkers centres on a washed-up former baseball player who begins to train as a race walker.

== See also ==
- Power walking
