= Fritz Tornow =

Adolf Hitler's dog handler

- Born: 27 July 1924; Weimar Republic
- Died: late 1990s Gelsenkirchen, Germany
- Occupation: Dog handler of Adolf Hitler
- Known for: Killing Hitler's dogs

Fritz Tornow (27 July 1924 – c. 1990s) was a Feldwebel in the German Army who served as Adolf Hitler's personal dog-handler. He was one of the last people to occupy the Führerbunker when the underground complex was captured by Soviet Red Army troops.

== Biography ==
Tornow had the task of taking care of Hitler's beloved German Shepherd Blondi, as well as her puppies, and Eva Braun's dogs. Additionally, Tornow had his own pet dachshund.

During the last days of World War II, Tornow was one of the few remaining German personnel in the Führerbunker. During the course of 29 April 1945, Hitler learned of the death of his ally, Benito Mussolini, who had been publicly executed by Italian partisans. This, along with the fact the Soviet Red Army was closing in on his location, led Hitler to strengthen his resolve not to be captured alive. That afternoon, Hitler expressed doubts about the cyanide capsules he had received through Heinrich Himmler's SS. To verify the capsules' potency, Hitler ordered Werner Haase to test them on his dog, Blondi. Tornow had to force the opening of the dog's mouth while Haase crushed a cyanide capsule in Blondi's mouth. Tornow became visibly upset by these events, more so when the dog died as a result.

According to a report commissioned by Joseph Stalin and based on eyewitness accounts, Tornow was further upset when he was ordered to shoot Blondi's puppies. On 30 April, Tornow took each of the four puppies and shot them in the garden of the Reich Chancellery, outside the underground bunker complex, after Hitler and Eva Braun committed suicide together. He also killed Eva Braun's two dogs, Frau Gerda Christian's dogs, and his own dachshund.

On 2 May 1945 the Soviet Red Army took control of the bunker complex. Tornow was among only five living occupants; the others were Werner Haase, nurses Erna Flegel and Liselotte Chervinska, and Johannes Hentschel. They all surrendered to the Soviet Army troops.

Tornow was taken back to the Soviet Union. He was tortured in the infamous Lubyanka prison in Moscow. In the mid-1950s, he was released and sent to West Germany. From the 1960s until the mid-1970s he was living at Paulinenhof in Hervest, part of Dorsten. He produced dog food there. He died at the end of the 1990s of natural causes in Gelsenkirchen, Germany.

== Portrayal in the media ==
- Robert Pugh in the 1981 made-for-television The Bunker
- Devid Striesow in the 2004 film Downfall

== Bibliography ==
- Eberle, Henrik; Uhl, Matthias, eds. (2005). The Hitler Book: The Secret Dossier Prepared for Stalin. New York: PublicAffairs. ISBN 1586483668.
- Lehmann, Armin Dieter; Carroll, Tim M. (2005). In Hitler's Bunker: A Boy Soldier's Eyewitness Account of the Fuhrer's Last Days. The Lyons Press. ISBN 1592285783.
- Kershaw, Ian (2008). Hitler: A Biography. New York: W. W. Norton & Company. ISBN 978-0393067576.
- O'Donnell, James (1978). The Bunker: The History of the Reich Chancellery Group. Boston: Houghton Mifflin. ISBN 0395257190.
- Vinogradov, V. K.; Pogonyi, J. F.; Teptzov, N. V., eds. (2005). Hitler's Death: Russia's Last Great Secret from the Files of the KGB. London: Chaucer Press. ISBN 978-1904449133.
