= Constanze Manziarly =

Cook and dietitian to Adolf Hitler (1920–1945)

- Manziarly in 1943
- Born: 14 April 1920; Innsbruck, Austria
- Disappeared: 2 May 1945 (aged 25); Berlin, Germany
- Status: Missing for 81 years, 5 months and 6 days
- Occupations: cook, dietitian
- Employer: Adolf Hitler

Notes
- *Her death was never confirmed.

Constanze Manziarly (14 April 1920 – disappeared 2 May 1945) was an Austrian dietician and teacher, known for serving as Adolf Hitler's last cook from 1944 to 1945.

Manziarly remained a member of Hitler's staff until May 1945, when she disappeared shortly after leaving the Führerbunker in Berlin. According to Hitler's secretary Traudl Junge, Manziarly was taken away by Soviet Red Army soldiers. (Note: Citing the inaccuracy of some of her other claims, historian Anton Joachimsthaler regards Junge as an unreliable eyewitness.)

== Early life and career ==
Manziarly was born on 14 April 1920 in Innsbruck, Tyrol, to parents from Vienna. She was raised in the Greek Orthodox Church. In 1937, her mother died of cancer.

Although Manziarly was apolitical, she was forced to join the League of German Girls and then the National Socialist Women's League following the 1938 Anschluss with Austria. In 1939, she was drafted into the Reich Labour Service, completing her service the following year in Mieming. From 1940 to 1942, she completed a college-level education in nutrition. She then trained for a year as a teacher, serving as a substitute teacher during her final semester and earning her teaching certificate in July 1943.

In September 1943, Manziarly began a six-month internship at a sanatorium in Bischofswiesen, Bavaria, to earn a qualification in dietetics, which she completed in early 1944. She had planned to begin working as a teacher in Innsbruck later that year when she was asked to cook for Adolf Hitler.

== Hitler's chef ==
Following the dismissal of Hitler's previous cook, Helene von Exner, over alleged Jewish ancestry, Manziarly was selected by the director of the Bavarian sanatorium to prepare Hitler's meals, which were driven to the nearby Berghof on a daily basis.

Hitler was pleased with Manziarly's service and recruited her to his staff. In July 1944, Manziarly travelled with Hitler to the Wolf's Lair, where she was present during the 20 July plot. There, she began attending Hitler's "tea parties", late-night soirees during which he delivered monologues. (Note: Transcribed speeches in the series are collected as Hitler's Table Talk, although only one entry from Manziarly's time in the circle survives.) As of November 1944, Hitler's secretary Traudl Junge considered Manziarly too new to be part of Hitler's "inner circle". In December 1944, Manziarly accompanied Hitler to Bad Nauheim, where he directed an unsuccessful offensive, which became known as the Battle of the Bulge.

Manziarly often confided to her family that the job made her uneasy, as it prevented her from beginning her career as a full-time teacher. She further observed that "any resistance would only lead to be me taken to court," comparing her situation to having "one foot in the grave". As Hitler refused to hire assistant chefs to avoid an appearance of excess, Manziarly was overworked and required treatment for poor circulation in her lower extremities, as well as gum recession. Additionally, Manziarly had to ask her family to send several basic clothing items and ration cards for darning thread, as she was otherwise not generally provided for.

=== Activities in Berlin, 1945 ===
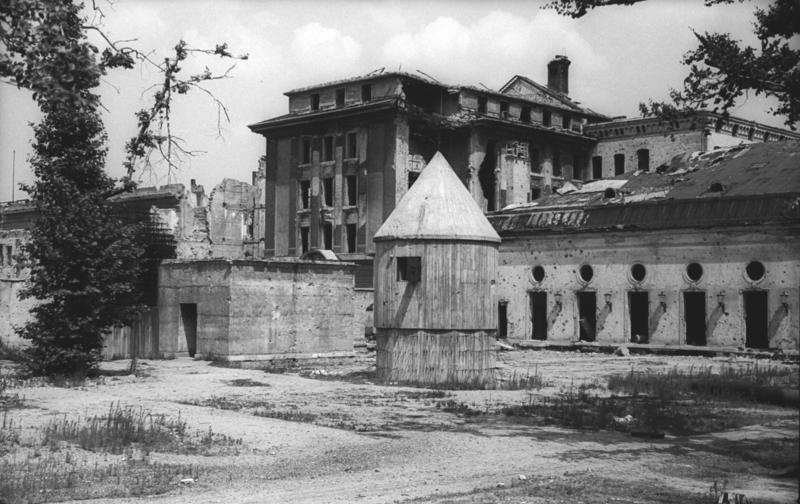
The Führerbunker's rear exit (1947)

On 16 January 1945, Hitler began residing in the Führerbunker, the newer and lower air-raid shelter of the Reich Chancellery bunker complex. Manziarly prepared his meals in the kitchen of the Vorbunker, the older upper bunker where she also slept. (Note: In late April, the secretaries moved their bedding into a meeting room of the Führerbunker, but it is unknown if Manziarly accompanied them.) Manziarly also prepared sandwiches to be set out on a tea wagon for high-ranking Nazi Party personnel and generals reporting to Hitler. No letters from her are known from 1945, with her last known phone contact with her father taking place that March. From 21 April on, Manziarly accompanied Eva Braun and Hitler's secretaries Junge and Gerda Christian to his downsized tea parties. Despite the gloomy atmosphere, some in the bunker nicknamed Manziarly "Miss Marzipani".

On 22 April, Hitler personally requested Manziarly to leave Berlin, along with Junge and Christian. All three women instead volunteered to stay with the dictator and were each provided a cyanide capsule from SS physician Ludwig Stumpfegger's supply in case they decided to end their own lives. The women learned from Hitler in the early hours of 30 April that he intended to shoot himself that day. Around noon, Hitler confirmed his intent to his private secretary Martin Bormann. Manziarly, Junge and Christian were present for Hitler's last meal at the usual time of 1 p.m. After lunch, Hitler's adjutant SS-Sturmbannführer Otto Günsche told the secretaries that Hitler wanted to bid everyone farewell. According to Junge, Manziarly cooked a posthumous meal for Hitler so others without direct knowledge of his death would not become suspicious.

On 1 May, Manziarly left the bunker in the first of ten breakout groups, which was led by SS-Brigadeführer Wilhelm Mohnke. Evading the Soviet Red Army troops, they made their way north to a German Army holdout in the cellar of the Schultheiss-Patzenhofer Brewery on Prinzenallee. The group included Junge, Christian, Bormann's secretary Else Krüger, and SS surgeon Ernst-Günther Schenck. Early on 2 May, several of the group were captured by Soviet soldiers.

Mohnke tasked the four women with trying to deliver his written report to Hitler's successor, Karl Dönitz. The women walked out of the brewery courtyard and made their way into the Soviet occupied area of Berlin. Christian and Krüger stayed at a water supply area, while Manziarly left Junge standing by so she could try to replace her Wehrmacht jacket with civilian clothes. (Note: Junge states in her memoir that all four women were wearing military jackets, but discarded them before leaving the brewery.) At this point, Junge alternatively stated (in a 1947 letter to Manziarly's father) that, having been dogged by Soviet patrols about the jacket, Manziarly went with a man who offered her some clothing or (in an unpublished manuscript) that she "wandered over towards a group of women". Junge wrote that she later saw Manziarly being taken by two Soviet soldiers towards a U-Bahn subway tunnel. She tried to intervene, but the soldiers pushed her back. Manziarly reassured Junge that "They want to see my papers." Shooting broke out, forcing Junge to quickly hide in a house. Junge wrote to Manziarly's father that his daughter had said she would have used her poison capsule before letting a soldier rape her; Junge also stated consolingly that many women (especially those found wearing manlike clothing) were purportedly sent off to Russian work camps and "relatively well off".

== Legacy ==
Manziarly's father contacted a number of individuals about her fate. Hitler's valet Heinz Linge wrote that he had no knowledge of her whereabouts after the breakout from Berlin, as he was with a different group. After spending 10 years in a Siberian penal camp, Hugo Blaschke's assistant Käthe Heusermann wrote that although she was well-acquainted with Manziarly, she had not come across any trace of her since the fall of Berlin. At her father's request, in 1963, Innsbruck officials declared Manziarly dead, stating that she was "taken away by the Russians".

Manziarly achieved fame as a notable missing person. Some fringe theories hold that she might have assumed a new identity – perhaps even using this to escape Germany with Hitler after he ostensibly faked his death. (Note: A body double, speculated by the Soviets to be Hitler, was variously claimed to be kitchen help.)

German author Stefan Dietrich became interested in Manziarly after reading about her in Junge's memoir as he came from the same region. He found Manziarly's sister, Susanne Schiessl (1918–2014), and Schiessl's daughter, who provided 15 letters published (and partially transcribed) in Dietrich's 2020 biography of Manziarly. (Note: Manziarly's family provided an authentic photograph from 1943, leading Dietrich to note that a picture from the same year by Hitler's photographer Heinrich Hoffman (claimed by some to show Manziarly with Arthur Kannenberg) is dated too early and thus probably depicts her predecessor, Helene von Exner.) Additionally, Eva Braun filmed a few seconds of Manziarly (the only known footage of her) at her sister Gretl Braun's wedding in June 1944.

== Depictions in film ==
Constanze Manziarly has been portrayed by the following actresses in film and television productions:

- Phyllida Law in the 1973 British film Hitler: The Last Ten Days
- Carole Boyd in the 1973 British television production The Death of Adolf Hitler
- Pam St. Clement in the 1981 American film The Bunker
- Bettina Redlich in the 2004 German film Downfall (Der Untergang)

== See also ==
- Adolf Hitler and vegetarianism
- List of people who disappeared
