= Until the Final Hour =

2002 book by Traudl Junge

Until the Final Hour (German: Bis zur letzten Stunde), also published as Until the Final Hour: Hitler's Last Secretary or simply Hitler's Last Secretary is a memoir of the last days of Adolf Hitler's government, written by Traudl Junge (née Humps) in 1947, but not published until 2002 (in German) and 2003 (in English). The book was part of the basis for the 2002 Austrian documentary Im toten Winkel - Hitlers Sekretärin (titled Blind Spot: Hitler's Secretary in English) and the film Der Untergang (The Downfall) in 2004.

== Synopsis ==
This memoir deals with the years (1942–1945) that Traudl Junge spent with Adolf Hitler as his personal secretary. When he first hired her she was 22 years old and was sought out because a secretary needed to be replaced.

During Traudl Junge's time with Hitler, she claims that she was blind to the genocidal activities that were conducted around her because she was so spellbound by Hitler's paternal charisma.

She also describes in great detail some of the luxuries that she and other secretaries took advantage of while working for Hitler. For instance, she was treated to tea-parties and dinner parties with Hitler, Eva Braun, the other secretaries (all women), and the military chiefs.

Traudl married Hans Hermann Junge, one of Hitler's military "orderlies". Although they were in love, they were hesitant to marry so soon because they had not known each other for very long. Hitler, however, goaded her into marrying Junge, which occurred in June 1943.

As the years passed, Hitler's health deteriorated, Germany began losing the war, and Hans Junge was killed in combat at the front in August 1944.

They traveled a great deal, going from the East Prussia Wolfsschanze (Wolf's Lair), to the Berghof, to Munich, to the Reichskanzlei (Reich Chancellery) and back, all by way of train. Once the Red Army began sweeping across eastern Europe after Stalingrad fell, the Wolfsschanze had to be abandoned.

Hitler had two bunkers built around the Reich Chancellery for protection from the air raids. The author was in the Reich Chancellery, the Vorbunker (upper bunker) and the lower Führerbunker with Hitler. Therein, they (along with Eva Braun and the others) awaited the eventual, inevitable fall of Berlin to the Soviet Army.

Reichsführer-SS Heinrich Himmler provided everyone with cyanide capsules. Hitler stated outright he would stay in Berlin, head up the defense of the city and shoot himself before he would surrender to the Soviet Union. The mood in the bunker in the final days was one primarily of depression and hopelessness. Hitler was dubious that the cyanide capsules would be powerful enough to kill him, so before he attempted his suicide, he tested a capsule on his beloved dog Blondi. The capsule killed Blondi almost instantly. In the afternoon of 30 April, Hitler killed himself with a gunshot wound to the right temple, using his own Walther PPK semiautomatic pistol chambered for 7.65 mm/.32 ACP. Eva Braun, his bride of fewer than 40 hours, used cyanide by itself. Minister for Public Enlightenment and Propaganda Joseph Goebbels and his wife Magda poisoned their six children with cyanide (to Junge's horror) and their bodies were found, in their beds in the Vorbunker, by the Soviets a few days later. Goebbels and his wife either committed suicide or had the SS guards shoot them ("eyewitness" accounts differ on this point).

Eventually, Junge and others still in the bunker complex were led out by SS-Brigadeführer Wilhelm Mohnke to try and break out of the Soviet encirclement. She and another secretary wanted to avoid the Soviets, so they decided to flee. Junge was eventually captured by soldiers of the Soviet Red Army but was held only briefly when she was later in the custody of the Americans. Considered to be merely a "young follower" she was quickly released and was never prosecuted for any crime.

In 1989 her manuscript detailing the war years was first published in the book Voices from the Bunker by Pierre Galante and Eugene Silianoff (New York: G.P. Putnam's Sons).

== See also ==
- Downfall, a movie partly based on the book

== Bibliography ==
- Original German edition: Junge, Traudl; Melissa Müller (2002). Bis Zur Letzten Stunde: Hitlers Sekretärin erzählt ihr Leben. München: Claassen. ISBN 978-3-546-00311-7.
- First US edition (2 April 2004): Junge, Traudl; Melissa Müller; Anthea Bell (2004). Until the Final Hour: Hitler's Last Secretary. New York: Arcade Publishing. ISBN 978-1-55970-728-2.
