= The Bunker (1981 film) =

American television film

- Genre: Drama; history; war
- Based on: The Bunker by James P. O'Donnell
- Written by: John Gay
- Directed by: George Schaefer
- Starring: Anthony Hopkins; Richard Jordan; Cliff Gorman; Susan Blakely
- Music by: Brad Fiedel
- Country of origin: United States
- Original language: English

Production
- Executive producer: Bernard Sofronski
- Producers: David Susskind; Diana Kerew
- Cinematography: Jean-Louis Picavet
- Editor: Greyfox
- Running time: 154 minutes
- Production company: Time-Life Productions

Original release
- Network: CBS
- Release: January 27, 1981

The Bunker is a 1981 American made-for-television historical war film produced by Time-Life Productions based on the 1975 book The Bunker by James P. O'Donnell.

The film, directed by George Schaefer and adapted for the screen by John Gay, is a dramatization depicting the events surrounding Adolf Hitler's last weeks in and around his underground bunker in Berlin before and during the Battle of Berlin. The film stars Anthony Hopkins as Hitler, plus a cast including Richard Jordan, Susan Blakely, and Cliff Gorman.

At the 33rd Primetime Emmy Awards in 1981, Anthony Hopkins won the Primetime Emmy Award for Outstanding Lead Actor in a Miniseries or a Movie beating out two actors from the miniseries Shogun (Richard Chamberlain and Toshiro Mifune) and two actors from the miniseries Masada (Peter O'Toole and Peter Strauss).

== Plot ==
The film opens in July 1945, with American correspondent James O'Donnell (James Naughton) gaining entry to the now dark and flooded Führerbunker by bribing a Soviet sentry with a packet of cigarettes. The film then tells the story of the occupants of the bunker between January and May 1945 as an extended flashback. A number of historical events and the reactions of the bunker's residents are presented, including the encirclement of Berlin, Hitler's last meeting with Albert Speer and the attempts by Speer to sabotage Hitler's scorched earth policy, Speer's abortive plan to kill Hitler in the bunker, Hitler's dismissal of Heinz Guderian, Hitler's firing of Heinrich Himmler and Hermann Goering, the failure of German forces to lift the siege, the murder of the Goebbels children, Hitler's wedding to Eva Braun, and the suicides of Hitler, Braun and the Goebbels family.

The film ends as groups of survivors are leaving the bunker complex of the Reich Chancellery. The final scene depicts the bunker's mechanic and final occupant, Hentschel, listening to a radio announcement that Hitler has died fighting. He throws a set of papers at the radio in disgust and the scene dissolves to a series of still images with voiceover explaining the fate of the remaining survivors. The last still image is of Hitler giving a speech during his rise to power, with O'Donnel's voiceover:

It was Thomas Hardy who said 'While much is too strange to be believed, nothing is too strange to have happened.'

The still then comes to life briefly, depicting Hitler giving a political speech. The scene dissolves into the final still image of the ruined bunker as the credits roll.

== Cast ==
- Anthony Hopkins as Adolf Hitler
- Richard Jordan as Albert Speer
- Cliff Gorman as Joseph Goebbels
- James Naughton as James P. O'Donnell
- Michel Lonsdale as Martin Bormann
- Piper Laurie as Magda Goebbels
- Susan Blakely as Eva Braun
- Martin Jarvis as Johannes Hentschel
- Michael Kitchen as Rochus Misch
- Robert Austin as Walter Wagner
- Andrew Ray as Otto Günsche
- Yves Brainville as Heinz Guderian
- Michael Culver as Wilhelm Mohnke
- Julian Fellowes as Nicolaus von Below
- Frank Gatliff as Ernst-Günther Schenck
- David Swift as Johann Rattenhuber
- Terrence Hardiman as Hermann Fegelein
- Edward Hardwicke as Dieter Stahl
- Karl Held as Hans Baur
- David King as Hermann Göring
- Sarah Marshall as Traudl Junge
- John Paul as Wilhelm Keitel
- Morris Perry as Werner Haase
- Pam St. Clement as Constanze Manziarly
- John Sharp as Theodor Morell
- Michael Sheard as Heinrich Himmler
- Tony Steedman as Alfred Jodl
- Peggy Frankston as Margarete Speer

In a short scene at the beginning of the film, a younger O'Donnell is played by actor James Naughton. O'Donnell himself provided brief voice-over narrations at the beginning and end of the film.

Anthony Hopkins won an Emmy for his portrayal of Adolf Hitler. Actors on the set claimed his performance was so convincing that those playing German soldiers snapped to attention whenever Hopkins came onto the set, even if he wasn't in character.

Actors Michael Sheard (Himmler) and Tony Steedman (Jodl) reprised their characters from the 1973 British television film The Death of Adolf Hitler.

== Awards and nominations ==
Year	Award	Category	Nominee(s)	Result	Ref.
1981	Primetime Emmy Awards	Outstanding Lead Actor in a Limited Series or a Special	Anthony Hopkins	Won	
1981	Primetime Emmy Awards	Outstanding Supporting Actress in a Limited Series or a Special	Piper Laurie	Nominated	
1981	Primetime Emmy Awards	Outstanding Film Sound Mixing	René Magnol, Robert L. Harman, William McCaughey, and Howard S. Wollman	Nominated	
