= Tony Steedman =

English actor (1927–2001)

- Publicity still, 1984
- Born: Anthony Francis Steedman; 21 August 1927; Warwickshire, England
- Died: 4 February 2001 (aged 73)
- Resting place: East London Cemetery, Plaistow, London
- Occupation: Actor
- Years active: 1957–1998
- Spouses: Ann Taylor (m. 1957; div. 1963) Judy Parfitt (m. 1963)
- Children: 2

Anthony Francis Steedman (21 August 1927 – 4 February 2001) was an English character actor, perhaps best known for roles in British TV drama series of the 1970s and 1980s, and for his role as Socrates in Bill & Ted's Excellent Adventure.

== Career ==
In addition to film work, his theatre appearances were extensive, including Ray Cooney's comedy Her Royal Highness in the West End of London, and he appeared in numerous television productions, including episodes of The Feathered Serpent, Thriller, The Professionals, Department S, Randall and Hopkirk (Deceased), Coronation Street, The Rivals of Sherlock Holmes, The Avengers, Babylon 5, The Sweeney, Minder and Barry Morse presents Strange But True. He had a recurring role in the British soap opera Crossroads as Dr. Butterworth. He was also a regular in the final two series of BBC sitcom Citizen Smith (1979–80) as Charlie Johnson. He holds the distinction of portraying Nazi General Alfred Jodl twice, first in The Death of Adolf Hitler (1973) and later in The Bunker (1981). Following his role in Bill and Ted, he voiced the character of Justin Hammer in the first season of Iron Man.

=== Partial filmography ===
- Department S 1968 - Hallet
- War & Peace (1972-1973) - Marshal Davout
- Gawain and the Green Knight (1973) - Fortinbras
- The Abdication (1974) - Carranza
- Golden Rendezvous (1977) - Assassin (uncredited)
- The Thirty Nine Steps (1978) - Admiral
- The Bunker (TV) (1981) - Gen. Alfred Jodl
- The Missionary (1982) - Lord Quimby
- Ascendancy (1982) - Colonel
- The Zany Adventures of Robin Hood (TV) (1984)
- My Two Dads (TV series) (1987) - School Director
- Scrooged (1988) - Bobby - the Headwaiter
- Bill & Ted's Excellent Adventure (1989) - Socrates
- The Golden Girls (TV) (1989) - Jasper DeKimmel
- Delirious (1991) - Edward - the Butler
- Split Second (1992) - Pat O'Donnell
- In Suspicious Circumstances (TV) (1996) - General Luard
- Mrs Dalloway (1997) - Prime Minister

== Personal life ==
Steedman met his first wife, Ann Taylor, in 1957 during a production of Oklahoma! and they were married in November of that year in Brackley. They had one daughter, and divorced in 1963.

Steedman's second wife was actress Judy Parfitt, whom he met in 1960 at the Birmingham Rep. They were married in 1963 and jointly ran Allerway Limited, an artistic creation company. They had one son together.

Steedman died on 4 February 2001.
