= Werner Haase =

SS officer and physician

- Haase in Soviet captivity
- Born: 2 August 1900; Köthen, Anhalt, German Empire
- Died: 30 November 1950 (aged 50); Butyrka, Moscow, Russian SFSR, Soviet Union
- Occupations: Physician, medicine professor
- Known for: Adolf Hitler's personal physician

Werner Haase (2 August 1900 – 30 November 1950) was a professor of medicine and SS member during the Nazi era. He was one of Adolf Hitler's personal physicians. After the war ended, Haase was made a Soviet prisoner of war. He died while in captivity in 1950.

== Early life and education ==
Haase was born in Köthen, in Anhalt. He graduated from secondary school in 1918. Haase then joined the 66th Infantry Regiment in World War I. After the war, he obtained his Doctor's degree in 1924 and then became a surgeon.

== Career ==
Haase was a ship doctor beginning in 1927. He joined the Nazi Party in 1933. From 1934, forward, he served on the staff of the surgery clinic of Berlin University.

Upon the recommendation of Karl Brandt, Haase began serving as Hitler's deputy personal physician. On 1 April 1934, Haase joined the SS and on 16 June 1943 he was promoted to SS-Obersturmbannführer. Hitler appears to have had a high opinion of him. In a telegram Hitler sent to Haase on his birthday in 1943, he stated: "Accept my heartfelt congratulations on your birthday", as reproduced in the book Hitler's Death: Russia's Last Great Secret from the Files of the KGB, based on documents in Soviet archives.

=== April–May 1945 ===
In late April 1945, during the last days of the fighting in the Battle of Berlin, Haase, with Ernst-Günther Schenck, worked to save the lives of the many wounded German soldiers and civilians in an emergency casualty station located in the large cellar of the Reich Chancellery. During surgeries, Schenck was aided by Haase. Although Haase had much more surgical experience than Schenck, he was greatly weakened by tuberculosis, and often had to lie down while giving verbal instruction to Schenck.

The large Chancellery cellar led a further one-and-a-half meters down to an air-raid shelter known as the Vorbunker. The Vorbunker was connected by a stairway down to the Führerbunker, which had become a de facto Führer Headquarters.

On 23 April 1945, Hitler's personal physician Theodor Morell and several others left Berlin by aircraft for the Obersalzberg leaving behind medications prepared for Hitler, which Haase and Heinz Linge, Hitler's valet, administered during Hitler's last week of life. SS physician Ludwig Stumpfegger distributed cyanide capsules to the various military adjutants, secretaries, and staff in the bunker. Doubting the efficacy of the cyanide capsules, Hitler ordered Haase summoned to the Führerbunker to test one on his dog Blondi on 29 April. A cyanide capsule was crushed in the mouth of the dog, which died as a result. Hitler, in conversations with Haase during this timeframe, asked the doctor for a recommended method of suicide. Haase instructed Hitler to bite down on a cyanide capsule while shooting himself in the head. Haase remained in the Führerbunker until Hitler's suicide the following afternoon. Haase then returned to his work at the emergency casualty station. In the seven days they worked together, Schenck and Haase performed some "three hundred and seventy operations". Haase, Helmut Kunz and two nurses, Erna Flegel and Liselotte Chervinska were taken prisoner there by Soviet Red Army troops on 2 May.

On 6 May, Haase was one of those taken by the Soviet authorities to identify the bodies of the former Reich Propaganda Minister Joseph Goebbels, his wife Magda Goebbels and their six children. Haase identified Goebbels' partly burned body by the metal brace Goebbels wore on his deformed right leg.

== Imprisonment and death, 1945–1950 ==
Haase was made a Soviet prisoner of war. In June 1945 he was charged with being "a personal doctor of the former Reichschancellor of Germany, Hitler, and also treated other leaders of Hitler's government and of the Nazi Party and members of Hitler's SS guard". The sentence is not recorded.

In 1950 Haase, who suffered from tuberculosis, died in captivity. The place of death is recorded as "Butyr prison hospital", likely the Butyrka prison in Moscow.

== See also ==
- Downfall, 2004 German film where he was portrayed by actor Matthias Habich. (N.B. The film's credits incorrectly state that Haase died in 1945)
