= Else Krüger =

Martin Bormann's secretary (1915–2005)

Else Krüger

Else Krüger (9 February 1915 – 24 January 2005) was Martin Bormann's secretary (and, allegedly, mistress) from the end of 1942 until 1 May 1945. (Note: O'Donnell, J. (2001) [1978], The Bunker. Junge and Christian, when interviewed by O'Donnell, both claimed that Bormann was having an affair with Krüger. When O'Donnell asked Krüger if this was true, she neither confirmed nor denied these statements.) She was born in Hamburg-Altona.

She was in the Führerbunker during the Battle of Berlin in World War II. Krüger was with Eva Braun, Gerda Christian, Traudl Junge, and Constanze Manziarly when German dictator Adolf Hitler told them that they must prepare to leave for the Berghof like the others. However, she volunteered to remain with Hitler in the Berlin Führerbunker. She was there when Braun indicated that she would never leave Hitler's side, and they embraced. Hitler gave each of the women a cyanide capsule. Then, on the afternoon of 30 April 1945, Hitler and Braun killed themselves.

Thereafter, Krüger left the Führerbunker on 1 May 1945 in a group led by Waffen-SS Brigadeführer Wilhelm Mohnke. On the morning of 2 May, some members of the group were captured by soldiers of the Soviet Red Army while hiding in a cellar at the Schultheiss-Patzenhofer Brewery on Prinzenallee. However, Krüger managed to escape to the British-occupied zone of Berlin, where she cooperated with the British authorities.

After the war, Krüger was interrogated by the British. She later married her British interrogator, Leslie James (1915–1995), on 23 December 1947 in Wallasey, Cheshire, UK. She lived under the name Else James in Wallasey and remained married to Leslie until his death. She died in Germany on 24 January 2005, aged 89, despite speculation that she was older.
