= Blind Spot: Hitler's Secretary =

Im toten Winkel
- Poster
- Directed by: André Heller; Othmar Schmiderer
- Written by: André Heller; Othmar Schmiderer
- Produced by: Danny Krausz; Kurt Stocker
- Starring: Traudl Junge
- Cinematography: Othmar Schmiderer
- Edited by: Daniel Poehacker
- Distributed by: Piffl Medien
- Release date: February 10, 2002
- Running time: 87 minutes (U.S.)
- Country: Austria
- Language: German

Im toten Winkel - Hitlers Sekretärin (titled Blind Spot: Hitler's Secretary in English) is a 2002 Austrian documentary directed by André Heller and Othmar Schmiderer.

== Description ==
Blind Spot is a 90-minute interview of Traudl Junge, the last personal secretary of the Third Reich dictator Adolf Hitler. Urged to tell her story by her friend, Austrian author Melissa Müller, Junge agreed to make a documentary with André Heller, an Austrian director and artist with Jewish family members who died in Nazi death camps. Two excerpts of this work, including the introduction and conclusion, are featured in the movie Der Untergang, which itself is partly based on Until the Final Hour, Junge's memoirs about her experiences with Hitler, written in 1947, but not published till 2002.

== See also ==
- List of German language films
- The World at War, a 1974 British television documentary series featuring an interview with Junge in the episode "Inside the Reich: Germany (1940–1944)."
