= Blondi =

Dog owned by Adolf Hitler (1941–1945)

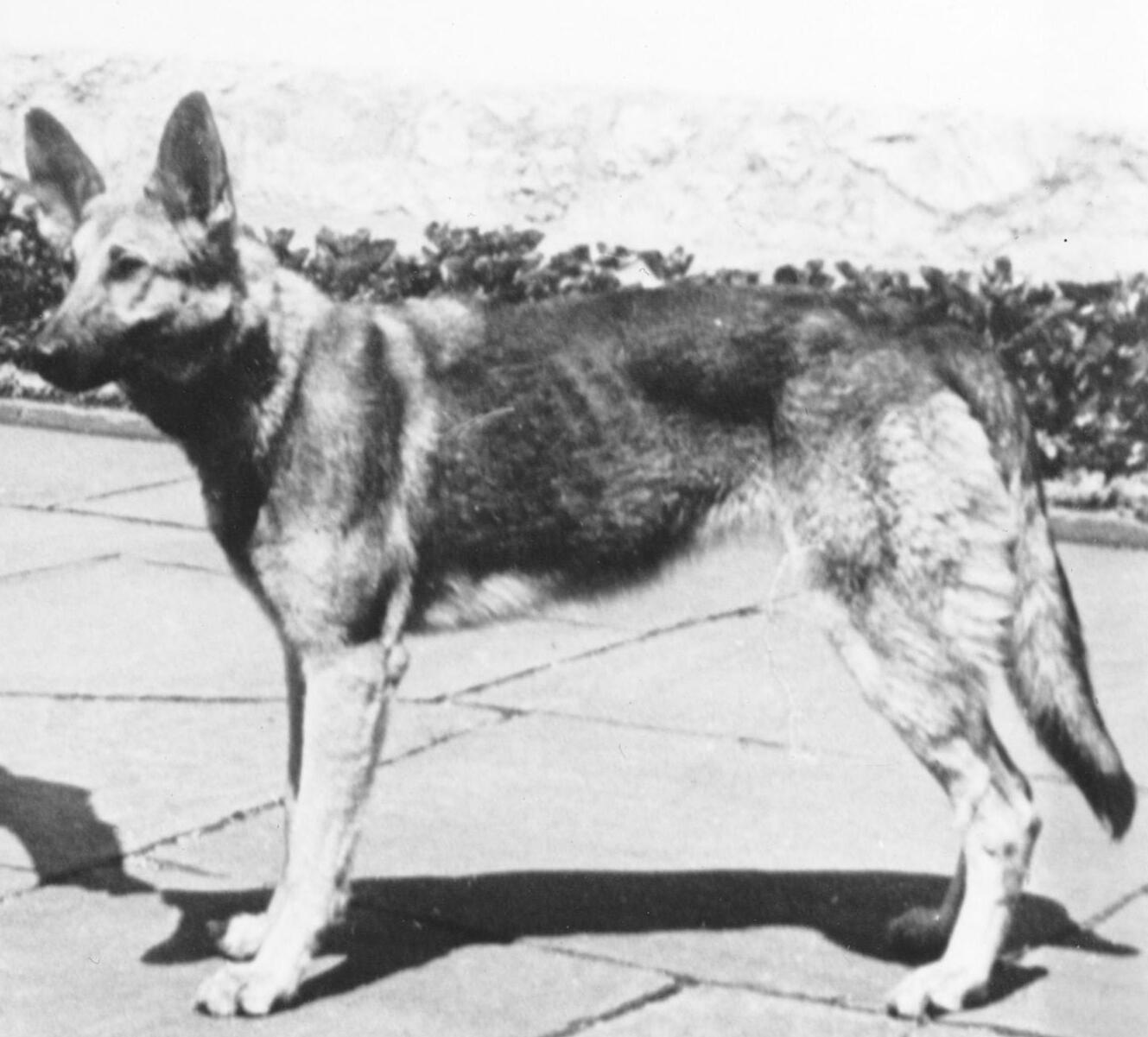
- Blondi in 1942
- Species: Canis lupus familiaris
- Breed: German Shepherd
- Sex: Female
- Born: 1941
- Died: 29 April 1945 (aged 3–4); Berlin, Germany
- Cause of death: Cyanide poisoning
- Nationality: Germany
- Owner: Adolf Hitler
- Offspring: Wulf and four other pups

Blondi (1941 – 29 April 1945) (Note: Some sources incorrectly suggest 1934 as Blondi's date of birth.) was Adolf Hitler's German Shepherd, a gift as a puppy from Martin Bormann in 1941. Hitler kept Blondi even after his move into the Führerbunker located underneath the garden of the Reich Chancellery on 16 January 1945.

Hitler was very fond of Blondi, keeping her by his side and allowing her to sleep in his bed while in the bunker. According to Hitler's secretary Traudl Junge, this affection was not shared by Eva Braun, Hitler's companion, who preferred her two Scottish Terrier dogs named Negus and Stasi.

Blondi played a role in Nazi propaganda by portraying Hitler as an animal lover. Dogs like Blondi were coveted as "germanische Urhunde" (ancient Germanic dogs), being close to the wolf, and became very fashionable during the Nazi era. On 29 April 1945, one day before his death, Hitler expressed doubts about the cyanide capsules he had received through Heinrich Himmler's SS. To verify the capsules' potency, Hitler ordered SS physician Werner Haase to test one on Blondi, who died as a result.

== Blondi's puppies ==
In March or in early April (likely 4 April) 1945, she had a litter of five puppies with Gerdy Troost's German Shepherd, Harras. Adolf Hitler named one of the puppies "Wulf", his favorite nickname and the meaning of his own first name, Adolf ("noble wolf"), and he began to train her. One of Blondi's puppies was reserved for Eva Braun's sister Gretl. Eva sent Gretl a letter containing a photo of Blondi and three of her puppies, Gretl's being indicated with an arrow.

== Other dogs ==
During his military service in World War I, Hitler rescued a stray white Fox Terrier named Fuchsl. Hitler had great affection for the dog, and when he was not on duty at the front, he would spend much of his free time playing with the dog in the barracks and teaching it tricks. Hitler was profoundly distraught when his unit had to move and the dog was lost in August 1917.

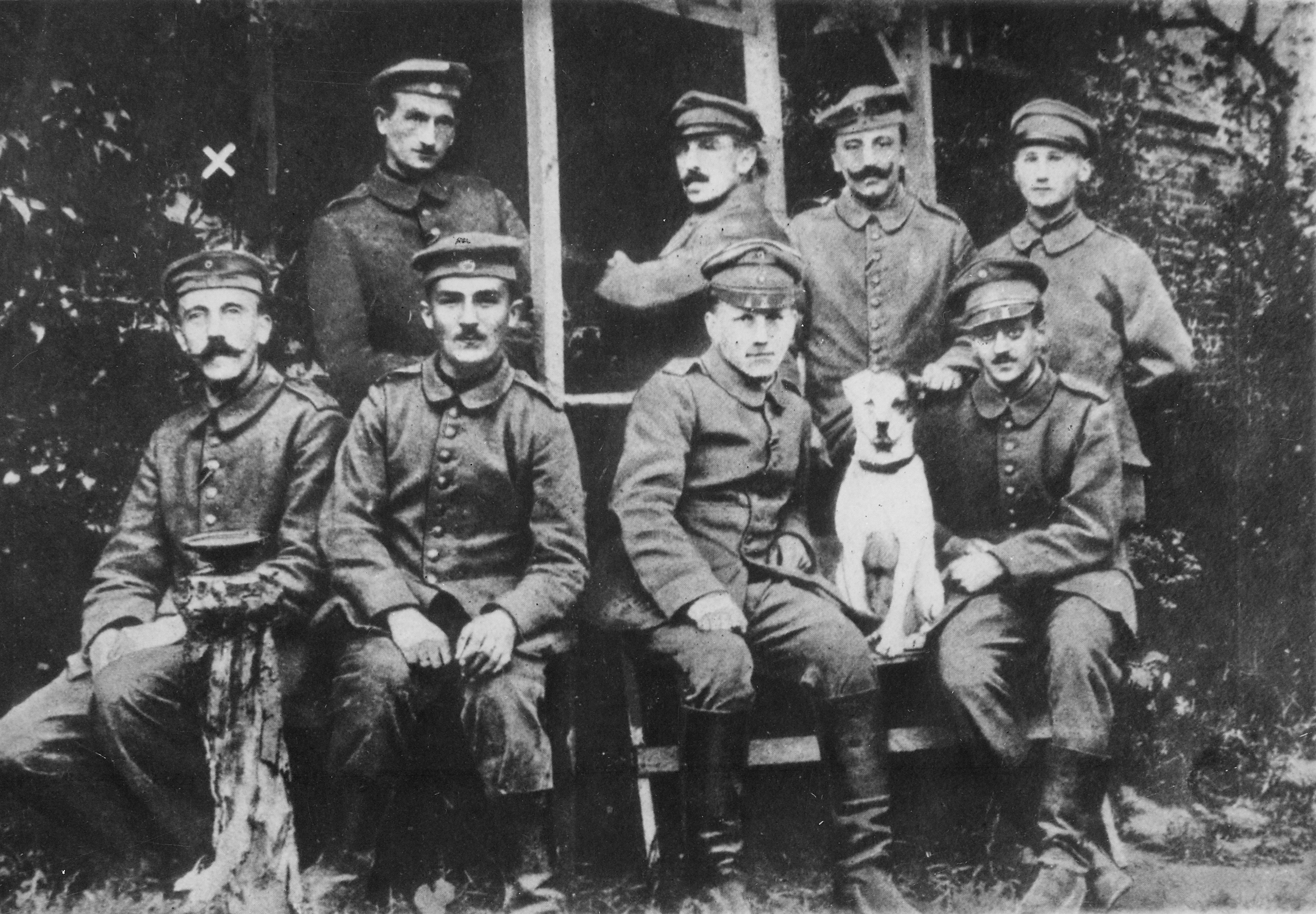
Hitler (the leftmost soldier) and Fuchsl (towards the right) in World War I

He had been given a German Shepherd before named "Prinz" in 1921, during his years of poverty, but he had been forced to lodge the dog elsewhere. However, the dog managed to escape and return to him. Hitler, who adored the loyalty and obedience of the dog, thereafter developed a great liking for the breed.

He also owned a German Shepherd called "Muckl". Before Blondi, Hitler had two German Shepherd dogs, a mother [born 1926] and daughter [born ca. 1930] – both named Blonda. In some photos taken during the 1930s the younger Blonda is incorrectly labeled as Blondi (in most cases photograph inscriptions were written later).

In May 1942, Hitler bought another young German Shepherd "from a minor official in the post office in Ingolstadt" to keep Blondi company. He called her Bella. According to Traudl Junge, Eva Braun was very fond of her two Scottish Terrier dogs named Negus and Stasi. She usually kept them away from Blondi.

Hitler was jealous about his dogs and got irritated when they showed affection to other people. The physician Ferdinand Sauerbruch claimed that in 1942 Hitler threatened to kill the dog Blondi because Sauerbruch played with it. Although in general he didn't like cats, Hitler developed a similar jealous attitude regarding a cat that strayed into his command post in Wolffschanze.

Hitler was very strict with his dogs, and got very angry when they disobeyed him. He often used to beat them on such occasions. Maria Reiter, a girl Hitler had dated in the late 1920s, told of an occasion where their dogs got into a fight, and then "Hitler suddenly intervened, like a maniac he hit his dog with his riding whip [...] and shook him violently by the collar." When she asked him how he could be so brutal to his dog he said "it was necessary".

== Death of Blondi and other dogs ==
During the course of 29 April 1945, Hitler learned of the death of his ally Benito Mussolini at the hands of Italian partisans on 28 April, and the public display of his body. This, along with the fact that the Soviet Red Army was closing in on his location, strengthened Hitler in his resolve not to allow himself or his wife to be captured. That afternoon, Hitler expressed doubts about the cyanide capsules he had received through Heinrich Himmler's SS. By this point, Hitler regarded Himmler as a traitor. To verify the capsules' contents, Hitler had SS physician Werner Haase summoned to the Führerbunker that afternoon to test one on his dog Blondi. A cyanide capsule was crushed in the mouth of the dog, who died as a result. Hitler was expressionless as he viewed the dog's corpse, but he became completely inconsolable.

According to a report commissioned by Joseph Stalin and based on eyewitness accounts, Hitler's dog-handler, Feldwebel Fritz Tornow, took Blondi's pups and shot them in the garden of the bunker complex on 30 April 1945, after Hitler and Eva Braun had committed suicide that same day. He also killed Eva Braun's two dogs, Gerda Christian's dogs, and his own dachshund. Tornow was later captured by the Allies. Erna Flegel, who met Hitler and worked at the emergency casualty-station in the Reich Chancellery, stated in 2005 that Blondi's death had affected the people in the bunker more than Eva Braun's suicide. After the battle in Berlin ended on 2 May 1945, the remains of Hitler, Braun, and two dogs (thought to be Blondi and her offspring Wulf) were discovered in a shell crater by a unit of SMERSH, the Soviet counter-intelligence agency. The dog thought to be Blondi was exhumed and photographed by the Soviets.

== See also ==
- Animal welfare in Nazi Germany
- List of individual dogs
