= Hans Hermann Junge =

German SS officer (1914–1944)

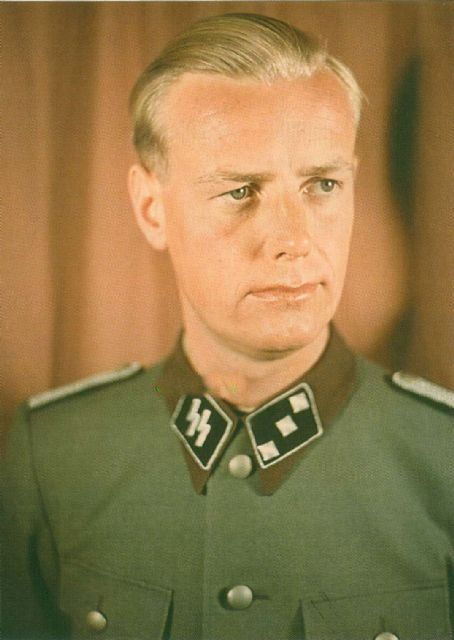
- Junge, c. 1944
- Born: 11 February 1914; Preetz, Schleswig-Holstein Province, German Empire
- Died: 13 August 1944 (aged 30); Dreux, German-occupied France
- Burial place: Champigny-Saint-André German war cemetery
- Spouse: Traudl Junge (m. 1943)
- Military career
- Allegiance: Nazi Germany
- Branch: Waffen-SS
- Service years: 1933–1944
- Rank: SS-Obersturmführer
- Units: SS Division Leibstandarte; Führerbegleitkommando; SS Division Hitlerjugend
- Conflicts: World War II; Battle of Normandy (KIA)

Hans Hermann Junge (11 February 1914 – 13 August 1944) (Note: Some sources give the date of death as 18 August 1944. Junge, Traudl (2002). Until the Final Hour, London, Notes section #10. ISBN 0-297-84720-1.) was a German SS officer who served as aide-de-camp and valet to Adolf Hitler. He was married to Traudl Junge, Hitler's last private secretary. He was killed in combat during the latter stages of the Battle of Normandy in August 1944 and is buried in Champigny-Saint-André German war cemetery.

== Career ==
Junge was born in Preetz in Schleswig-Holstein Province in February 1914. He joined the Schutzstaffel (SS) and in 1934 volunteered for the 1st SS Division Leibstandarte SS Adolf Hitler. On 1 July 1936, he became a member of the Führerbegleitkommando, which provided security protection for Hitler. In 1940, Junge became a valet and orderly to Hitler and met Traudl Humps, who was Hitler's last private secretary. Junge was considered Hitler's second valet after Heinz Linge. Junge worked as a valet in the Reich Chancellery in Berlin and at Hitler's residence near Berchtesgaden. According to Traudl, although they were called valets, the two men were really managers of Hitler's household. They accompanied him wherever he went and were in charge of Hitler's daily routine, including waking him, providing newspapers and messages, and determining the daily menu/meals and wardrobe. Linge and Junge would trade shifts every two days.

With the encouragement of Hitler, Junge and Humps married on 19 June 1943. On 14 July 1943, he joined the Waffen-SS. About Junge's going to the front, his wife Traudl wrote in her memoirs:

He was one of the few people to realise that, in the long run, Hitler's ideas would have such an effect on you that, in the end, you would not know what you had thought of yourself, and what was due to outside influence. Junge wanted his sense of objectivity back. He had applied several times to go to the front, which was the only way he could give up his job with Hitler.

The following year, he died in combat as an SS-Obersturmführer (first lieutenant) in a low-flying aircraft attack in Dreux, France. According to Lehmann and Carroll, "Hitler had liked Hans Junge and was so upset by his death that he broke the news to Traudl Junge personally." Traudl stated that Hitler asked her to stay on as his secretary. He promised to "look after" Traudl now that she was a widow.
