= Helmut Kunz =

SS dentist who assisted murdering six children of Joseph Goebbels (1910–1976)

- Born: 26 September 1910; Ettlingen, German Empire
- Died: 23 September 1976 (aged 65); Freudenstadt, West Germany
- Military career
- Allegiance: Nazi Germany
- Branch: Waffen-SS
- Service years: 1936–1945
- Rank: Sturmbannführer
- Unit: Dental (medical) office
- Conflicts: World War II

Helmut Kunz (26 September 1910 – 23 September 1976) was an SS dentist who, after the suicide of Adolf Hitler, was ordered to administer anesthetic to the six children of Joseph Goebbels before they were killed.

== Early years ==
Kunz was born in Ettlingen, Germany. He first studied law, then dentistry. He wrote his doctoral thesis on "studies of dental caries among school children as related to their feeding in infancy". In 1936, he opened a dental practice in Lucka, south of Leipzig. He also joined the SS, unit Sturm 10 of the 84. SS-Standarte in Weißenfels, Sachsen.

== SS career ==
In 1939, Kunz was a member of the 3rd SS Division Totenkopf. In 1941 he was seriously injured and assigned to the Waffen-SS medical office in Berlin as a junior assistant of the Dentist-General. In late April 1945 he was assigned to the Reich Chancellery in Berlin.

Kunz is believed to have most likely been a staunchly ideologically committed Nazi.

== Killing of the Goebbels children ==
Unlike many other leading Nazis by April 1945, Joseph Goebbels showed his strong support for Hitler by moving himself and his family into the Vorbunker, which was connected to the lower Führerbunker under the Reich Chancellery garden in central Berlin. Magda Goebbels was Kunz's first patient in the Chancellery. She had developed an abscess under a bridge in her lower jaw. On 27 April 1945, Magda took Kunz aside to ask his help in killing her children. After meeting the children, he left and returned to his duty post at the Chancellery. On 1 May, Magda telephoned and requested he come to the Vorbunker. Once there, she told him that Hitler was dead and there were groups attempting to break out of the Soviet ring, but the Goebbels had decided it was time to die. Magda and her husband, Joseph Goebbels, insisted that Kunz help them. According to Kunz, he injected the Goebbels children with morphine which Magda obtained from Ludwig Stumpfegger to render them unconscious before cyanide capsules were administered.

== Capture and later life ==
Kunz returned to work at the emergency casualty station, where he remained until taken prisoner by Soviet Red Army troops on 2 May. Werner Haase, along with two nurses, Erna Flegel and Liselotte Chervinska were also taken prisoner with him. He spent ten years in Soviet captivity, then returned to Münster. In 1955, a former Waffen-SS sergeant and prisoner of war, Harri Mengershausen, implicated Kunz in the children's deaths.

In his testimony, Kunz said that he injected the children with morphine but it was Magda Goebbels, (the mother of the children), or Ludwig Stumpfegger, who slipped the children cyanide capsules. This contradicts the testimony of SS-Oberscharführer Rochus Misch, a member of Hitler's Führerbegleitkommando bodyguard and head of communications in the Führerbunker, and statements by Goebbels State Secretary in the Propaganda Ministry, Werner Naumann. Naumann and Misch both stated it was actually Hitler's surgeon SS Stumpfegger who mixed a sweetened narcotic drink to put the Goebbels children into a deep sleep before Magda Goebbels placed cyanide capsules into their mouths.

The German courts refused to convict Kunz, and he remained in dental practice, highly regarded until his death. He died in Freudenstadt in 1976, and is buried in the Städtischer Friedhof (municipal cemetery).

== In popular culture ==
Unlike Stumpfegger, Kunz was not portrayed at all in the film Downfall.
