= Traudl Junge =

Adolf Hitler's secretary from 1942 to 1945

- Born: Gertraud Humps; 16 March 1920; Munich, Bavaria, Germany
- Died: 10 February 2002 (aged 81); Munich, Bavaria, Germany
- Occupations: Secretary; copy editor; science reporter
- Known for: Adolf Hitler's personal secretary during World War II
- Spouse: Hans Hermann Junge (m. 1943; died 1944)

Gertraud "Traudl" Junge (née Humps; 16 March 1920 – 10 February 2002) was a German editor who worked as Adolf Hitler's last private secretary from December 1942 to April 1945. After typing Hitler's will, she remained in the Berlin Führerbunker until his death.

Following her arrest and imprisonment in June 1945, both the Soviet and the U.S. militaries interrogated her. Later, in post-war West Germany, she worked as a secretary. In her old age, she published her memoirs, claiming ignorance of the Nazi atrocities during the war, but blaming herself for missing opportunities to investigate reports about them. Her story, based partly on her book Until the Final Hour, formed a part of several dramatizations, in particular the 2004 German film Downfall about Hitler's final ten days.

== Early life and education ==
Gertraud "Traudl" Humps was born in Munich, the daughter of a master brewer and lieutenant in the Reserve Army, Max Humps, and his wife, Hildegard (née Zottmann). She had a sister, Inge, born in 1923. She once expressed her desire to become a ballerina as a teenager, but was not accepted by a dance school. She then trained as a secretary. When she heard about an opening on the Chancellery staff, she applied for it.

== Work for Hitler ==
Traudl Humps began working for Hitler in December 1942. She was the youngest of his private secretaries. "I was 22 and I didn't know anything about politics; it didn't interest me," Junge said decades later, adding that she felt great guilt for "liking the greatest criminal ever to have lived".

She said, "I admit, I was fascinated by Adolf Hitler. He was a pleasant boss and a fatherly friend. I deliberately ignored all the warning voices inside me and enjoyed the time by his side, almost until the bitter end. It wasn't what he said, but the way he said things and how he did things."

Encouraged by Hitler, in June 1943, Traudl married Waffen-SS officer Hans Hermann Junge (1914–1944), who had been a valet and orderly to Hitler. The two were married by a priest. Her husband died in combat in France in August 1944. She worked at Hitler's side in Berlin, the Berghof in Berchtesgaden, at Wolfsschanze in East Prussia, and back again in Berlin in the Führerbunker.

== Berlin, 1945 ==
In 1945, Junge was with Hitler in Berlin. During Hitler's last days in Berlin, he regularly ate lunch with his secretaries Junge and Gerda Christian. After the war, Junge recalled Gerda asking Hitler if he would leave Berlin. This was firmly rejected by Hitler. Both women recalled that Hitler, in conversation, made it clear that his body must not fall into the hands of the Soviets. He would shoot himself. Junge typed Hitler's last private and political will and testament in the Führerbunker the day before his suicide. Junge later wrote that while she was playing with the Goebbels children on 30 April, "Suddenly ... there is the sound of a shot, so loud, so close, that we all fall silent. It echoed on through all the rooms. 'That was a bull's-eye,' cried Helmut [Goebbels] with no idea how right he is. The Führer is dead now."

On 1 May, Junge left the Führerbunker with a group led by Waffen-SS general Wilhelm Mohnke. Also in the group were Hitler's personal pilot Hans Baur, chief of Hitler's Reichssicherheitsdienst (RSD) bodyguard Hans Rattenhuber, secretaries Gerda Christian and Else Krüger, Hitler's dietician Constanze Manziarly, and physician Ernst-Günther Schenck. Junge, Christian, and Krüger made it out of Berlin to the River Elbe. The remainder of the group was found by Soviet Red Army troops on 2 May while hiding in a cellar off the Schönhauser Allee. The Soviet troops handed over those who had been in the Führerbunker to SMERSH for interrogation, to reveal what had occurred in the bunker during the closing weeks of the war.

== Post-war ==
Although Junge had reached the Elbe, she was unable to reach the western Allied lines and so she went back to Berlin. Arriving there about a month after she had left, she had hoped to take a train to the west when they began running again. On 9 June, after living there for about a week under the alias Gerda Alt, she was arrested by two civilian members of the Soviet military administration and was kept in Berlin for interrogation. While in prison, she heard harrowing tales from her Soviet guards about what the German military had done to members of their families in the Soviet Union and came to realise that much of what she thought she knew about the war in the east was only what the Nazi propaganda ministry had told the German people and that the treatment meted out to Germans by the Soviets was a response to what the Germans had done in the Soviet Union.

Junge was held in several jails, where she was often interrogated about her role in Hitler's entourage and the events surrounding Hitler's suicide. By December 1945, she had been released from prison but was restricted to the Soviet sector of Berlin. On New Year's Eve 1945, she was admitted to a hospital in the British sector for diphtheria and remained there for two months. While she was there, her mother was able to secure for her the paperwork required to allow her to move from the British sector in Berlin to Bavaria. Receiving these on 2 February 1946, she travelled from Berlin and across the Soviet occupation zone (which was to become East Germany) to the British zone, and from there south to Bavaria in the American Zone. Junge was held by the Americans for a short time during the first half of 1946 and interrogated about her time in the Führerbunker. She was then freed and allowed to live in post-war West Germany.

== Later life and death ==
After the war, Junge appeared in episodes of the Thames Television (ITV) 1973 television documentary series The World at War – No. 16, "Inside the Reich" (1940–1944), and No. 21, "Nemesis: Germany (February – May 1945)", as well as the two special documentaries "Secretary to Hitler" (1974) and "The Two Deaths of Adolf Hitler" (1975). She was also interviewed for the 1975 book The Bunker by James P. O'Donnell and Uwe Bahnsen. She worked in secretarial jobs and for many years as chief secretary of the editorial staff of the weekly illustrated magazine Quick. Junge twice resided briefly in Australia, where her younger sister lived, although her application for permanent residence was denied owing to her past Nazi association.

In 1989, Junge's manuscript about her life throughout the war was published by G. P. Putnam's Sons (New York) as part of the book Voices from the Bunker by Pierre Galante and Eugene Silianoff. Also in that year, she was interviewed in the BBC documentary The Fatal Attraction of Adolf Hitler, in which she discussed at length her impressions of Hitler and the final days with him in the Führerbunker. In 1991, she appeared in the documentary series Hitler's Henchmen produced by German television channel ZDF. Her memoir Until the Final Hour, originally written in 1947, describes the time she worked for Hitler. It is edited by Melissa Müller, and published in 2002. She was also interviewed for the 2002 documentary film Blind Spot: Hitler's Secretary.

Junge died from cancer in Munich on 10 February 2002 at the age of 81, reportedly having said shortly before her death, "Now that I've let go of my story, I can let go of my life." She is buried at Nordfriedhof München.

Some of Junge's experiences with Hitler were portrayed in the 2004 film Downfall, wherein she is portrayed by actress Alexandra Maria Lara. Excerpts from her interviews are seen at the beginning and at the end of the film. At the end of the film, she states:

Of course, the horrors, of which I heard in connection of the Nuremberg trials; the fate of the 6 million Jews, their killing and those of many others who represented different races and creeds, shocked me greatly, but, at that time, I could not see any connection between these things and my own past. I was only happy that I had not personally been guilty of these things and that I had not been aware of the scale of these things. However, one day, I walked past a plaque on the Franz-Joseph Straße (in Munich), on the wall in memory of Sophie Scholl. I could see that she had been born the same year as I, and that she had been executed the same year I entered Hitler's service. And, at that moment, I really realised that it was no excuse that I had been so young. I could perhaps have tried to find out about things.

== See also ==
- Christa Schroeder
- Erna Flegel
- Johanna Wolf
