= Ernst-Günther Schenck =

German SS surgeon

- Born: 3 October 1904 Marburg, Province of Hesse-Nassau, Kingdom of Prussia, German Empire
- Died: 21 December 1998 (aged 94) Aachen, North Rhine-Westphalia, Germany
- Allegiance: Nazi Germany
- Branch: Schutzstaffel (SS)
- Rank: Obersturmbannführer
- Conflicts: World War II

Ernst-Günther Schenck (3 October 1904 – 21 December 1998) was a German medical doctor and member of the SS in Nazi Germany. Because of a chance encounter with Adolf Hitler during the closing days of World War II, his memoirs proved historically valuable. His accounts of this period are prominent in the works of Joachim Fest and James P. O'Donnell regarding the end of Hitler's life, and were included in the film Downfall (2004). Schenck was not allowed to continue his medical career in post-war Germany.

== Biography ==
Schenck was born in Marburg, Hesse-Nassau. His father was a professor at Muenster University, teaching classical literature and the humanities. He trained as a doctor and joined the SS. During the war, Schenck was actively involved in the creation of a large herbal plantation in Dachau concentration camp, which contained over 200,000 medicinal plants, from which, among other things, vitamin supplements for the Waffen-SS were manufactured. In 1940 he was appointed as inspector of nutrition for the SS. In 1943, Schenck developed a protein sausage, which was meant for the SS frontline troops. Prior to its adoption it was tested on 370 prisoners in Mauthausen-Gusen concentration camp, some of whom died of hunger edema. In his own memoirs, Schenck stated that his only concern was to improve nutrition and fight hunger. However, a report in 1963 condemned Schenck for "treating humans like objects, guinea pigs". In the Federal Republic of Germany, Schenck was later not allowed to continue his medical career. He was also associated with Erwin Liek's attempts to develop holistic methods to prevent cancer.

According to Waffen-SS Oberscharführer Hans Bottger with the 1st SS Panzer Division Leibstandarte SS Adolf Hitler, Schenck left his government duty post to go to the Eastern Front for his so-called "Iron Cross apprenticeship" during the Germans' first campaign. Schenck proved himself while serving as the battalion physician. Further, instead of just manipulating his way into getting the award like many others, Schenck found himself taking command of a gun battery after the commander had been killed. Schenck performed "well" in combat and earned the Iron Cross, Second Class.

=== Berlin 1945 ===
In April 1945, during the battle in Berlin, Schenck was ordered to evacuate the city with the SS personnel, but he volunteered to stay with some other medical personnel. He also volunteered to work in an emergency casualty station located in the large cellar of the Reich Chancellery, near the Vorbunker and Führerbunker. Although he was not trained as a surgeon and lacked the experience, as well as the supplies and instruments necessary to operate on battle victims, he nonetheless assisted in major surgical operations. During these surgeries, Schenck was aided by Dr. Werner Haase, who also served as one of Hitler's private physicians. Although Haase had years of surgical experience, he was greatly weakened by tuberculosis, and often had to lie down on a cot while giving verbal advice to Schenck.

By 28 April, the emergency casualty station was in desperate need of medical supplies. During the battle, Schenck went out in a Wehrmacht truck into Berlin to obtain medical supplies to bring back to the casualty station. Upon returning to the emergency casualty station, Schenck resumed his surgical duties. In the seven days they worked together, Schenck and Haase performed some "three hundred and seventy operations". He later recalled the terrible conditions and experience, after the war, to author/historian James P. O'Donnell.

During the end time in Berlin, Schenck saw Hitler in person twice, for only a brief time: once when Hitler wanted to thank him, Haase, and nurse Erna Flegel for their emergency medical services, and once during the "reception" after Hitler's marriage to Eva Braun. During the early morning of 1 May 1945, Haase took Schenck aside while at the emergency casualty station to tell him that Hitler was dead. Schenck was later taken prisoner by the Soviet Army during the attempted Berlin "break-out" of 1 May. Following their surrender, Schenck, Wilhelm Mohnke and other senior German officers from the group were treated to a banquet by the Chief of Staff of the 8th Guards Army with the permission of Lieutenant General Vasily Chuikov. At 10:30 pm, the Germans were ushered out into another room where they were confined under guard. On the following night of 3 May, Schenck and the rest of the Germans were handed over to the NKVD. Schenck was released from Soviet captivity in 1953 and returned home to (then) West Germany. There he worked at Chemie Grünenthal (now Grünenthal GmbH).

Prior to writing his memoirs, Schenck was interviewed in depth by O'Donnell for the book The Bunker, which recounted portions of Schenck's memories of Hitler's last days. The possibility that Hitler suffered from Parkinson's disease was first investigated by Schenck. He published his opinions and findings in a book, Patient Hitler. Eine medizinische Biographie, in 1989. Schenck died on 21 December 1998 aged 94 in Aachen.

== Film portrayals ==
Ernst-Günther Schenck has been portrayed by the following actors in film and television productions:

- The character of Dr. Hohenegg in Jonathan Littell's docudrama Les Bienveillantes is partially based on Schenck.
- Frank Gatliff in the United States television production The Bunker (1981).
- Christian Berkel in the German film Downfall (2004, Der Untergang).

== See also ==
- Death of Adolf Hitler
