= Richard Friedländer =

German Jewish merchant and Holocaust victim (1881–1939)

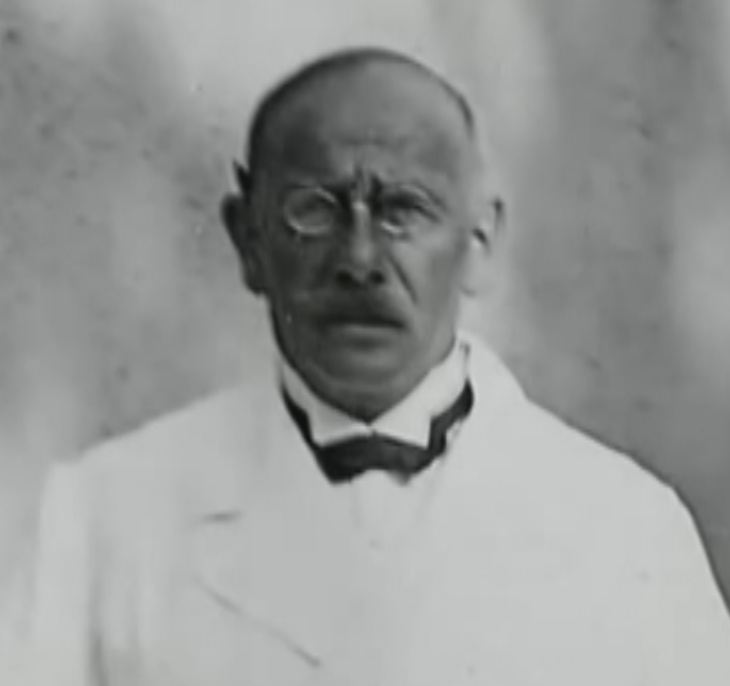
Richard Friedländer (deceased 1939 at KZ Buchenwald), stepfather of Magda Goebbels

Richard Friedländer (15 February 1881 in Berlin – 18 February 1939 at Buchenwald concentration camp) was a German Jewish merchant and Holocaust victim. He was the adoptive father of Magda Goebbels.

== Life ==
Friedländer was born to a wealthy Jewish Berlin merchant family. After attending junior and high schools, he was employed as a merchant in Brussels. In 1908, he married Auguste Behrend, who was divorced from her first husband, Oskar Ritschel, and was the mother of Magda. Magda was enrolled at the Ursuline Convent in Vilvoorde. Friedländer eventually adopted Magda. In 2016, it was reported that Friedländer may have been Magda's biological father, as stated in his residency card, found in the Berlin archives by writer and historian Oliver Hilmes. However, Magda's adoption may have been required for her parents' delayed marriage, to update the girl's 'illegitimate child' status.

Magda met Günther Quandt in 1920. She and Quandt were married on 4 January 1921, and her first child, Harald, was born on 1 November 1921. The couple divorced in 1929. In December 1931, Magda married Joseph Goebbels, the Nazi Party Gauleiter (and later leader of the Reich Ministry of Public Enlightenment and Propaganda).

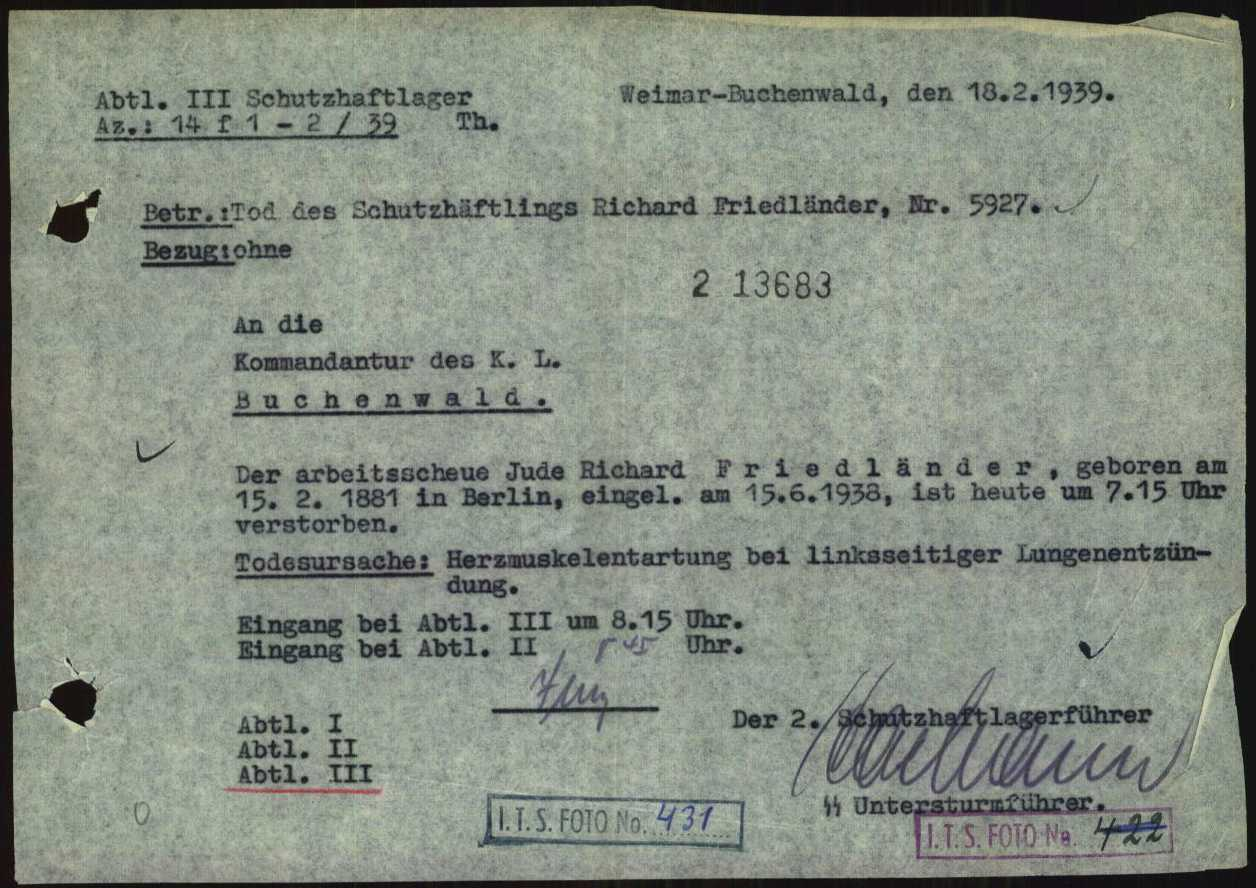
Death report (Buchenwald)

On 15 June 1938, Friedlander was deported to Buchenwald concentration camp during June action Aktion Arbeitsscheu Reich. Already injured, the hard work and catastrophic living conditions led to his early death. His death certificate listed the cause of death as "heart muscle failure".
