= Gerda Christian =

One of Adolf Hitler's secretaries

- Portrait of Christian
- Born: Gerda Daranowski; 13 December 1913; Berlin, German Empire
- Died: 14 April 1997 (aged 83); Düsseldorf, Federal Republic of Germany
- Other name: Gerda Daranowski (maiden name)
- Known for: Adolf Hitler's personal secretary before and during the Second World War
- Spouse: Eckhard Christian (m. 1943; div. 1946)

Gerda Christian (née Daranowski; 13 December 1913 – 14 April 1997), nicknamed "Dara", was one of Adolf Hitler's private secretaries before and during World War II.

== Biography ==
Gerda Daranowski worked for Elizabeth Arden before beginning to work for Hitler. In 1937 Hitler's other secretaries, Johanna Wolf and Christa Schroeder, complained about having too much work. They asked for assistance, but Hitler reportedly hesitated: he did not wish to see a new face in his inner sanctum. He finally relented and hired Daranowski.

=== World War II ===
Daranowski had been engaged to Hitler's driver Erich Kempka and later married Luftwaffe officer Eckhard Christian on 2 February 1943 in Danzig. After her marriage, she took a break from her employment for Hitler. In mid-1943, Gerda Christian returned to Hitler's staff as one of his private secretaries. Eckhard Christian was promoted to Generalmajor and Chief of the Luftwaffe Command Staff at Hitler's request on 1 September 1944. In April 1945, he was stationed in Berlin at the Führerbunker HQ. He left the bunker complex on 22 April 1945 to become Chief of the liaison staff of the Luftwaffe to OKW Command Staff North. Gerda and Traudl Junge both volunteered to remain with Hitler in the Führerbunker. While in the bunker complex, the women also looked after the Goebbels children.

During Hitler's last days in Berlin, he would regularly eat lunch with Junge and Christian. After the war, Junge recalled Christian asking Hitler if he would leave Berlin. He firmly rejected the notion. Christian recalled that Hitler made it clear in conversation that his body must not fall into the hands of the Soviets. He would shoot himself and wanted to be cremated "without a trace". Eva Braun said she would take cyanide poison. At one of these mealtime conversations, Hitler gave Christian a cyanide ampoule for use.

In the early afternoon of 30 April 1945, Hitler and Braun said farewell to members of the Führerbunker staff and fellow occupants, including Bormann, Joseph Goebbels and his family, the secretaries, and several military officers. After the farewells, Christian returned to the secretary quarters located in part of the large cellars under the Reich Chancellery. Later she returned to the Führerbunker and learned from the chief valet, Heinz Linge, that Hitler was dead and his corpse had been carried upstairs and out into the Chancellery garden where the cremation was still in progress. She walked into Hitler's study and saw a bloodstain "about the size of a hand" on the rug next to the sofa.

After Hitler's death, Christian tried to escape from Berlin on 1 May 1945. She was part of a group led by SS-Brigadeführer Wilhelm Mohnke, which included secretaries Else Krüger and Traudl Junge. Members of the group were taken prisoner by the Soviets on the morning of 2 May while hiding in a cellar off the Schönhauser Allee. However, Christian would be among those who escaped, only to later be captured by American forces in March 1946.

=== Post-war ===
In 1946, Christian divorced her husband because he had not remained with her in the Führerbunker until the death of Hitler. She moved to Düsseldorf, where she worked at the Hotel Eden. She was a friend of Werner Naumann, a former state secretary in the Third Reich's propaganda ministry. In 1953, Naumann was arrested by the British Army and accused of being the leader of a neo-Nazi group, although he was never convicted. Christian died of cancer in Düsseldorf in 1997, aged 83.

== Portrayal in the media ==
Christian has been portrayed by the following actresses in film and television productions.

- Sheila Gish in the 1973 British-Italian film Hitler: The Last Ten Days.
- Mitzi Rogers in the 1973 British television production The Death of Adolf Hitler.
- Birgit Minichmayr in the 2004 German film Downfall (Der Untergang).

== Sources ==
- Beevor, Antony (2002). Berlin – The Downfall 1945. Viking-Penguin Books. ISBN 978-0-670-03041-5.
- Hamilton, Charles (1984). Leaders & Personalities of the Third Reich, Vol. 1. R. James Bender Publishing. ISBN 0-912138-27-0.
- Joachimsthaler, Anton (1999) [1995]. The Last Days of Hitler: The Legends, the Evidence, the Truth. Trans. Helmut Bögler. London: Brockhampton Press. ISBN 978-1-86019-902-8.
- O'Donnell, James Preston (1978). The Bunker: The History of the Reich Chancellery Group. Boston: Houghton Mifflin. ISBN 978-0-395-25719-7.
