= Johannes Hentschel =

German mechanic (1908–1982)

- Born: 10 May 1908; Berlin, German Empire
- Died: 27 April 1982 (aged 73); Achern, West Germany
- Occupation: Mechanic
- Known for: Being the last occupant of the Führerbunker

Johannes Hentschel (10 May 1908 – 27 April 1982) was a German mechanic who served at Adolf Hitler's Reich Chancellery apartments in Berlin during World War II. He also served in the same capacity in Hitler's Führerbunker in 1945. He surrendered to Soviet Red Army soldiers on 2 May 1945.

== Early life ==
Hentschel was born in Berlin on 10 May 1908.

== Career ==
Hentschel was hired on 4 July 1934 as a master electro-mechanic for Adolf Hitler's personal apartments in the Reich Chancellery building. Years later, during the Battle of Berlin, he was responsible for the machine room in the Führerbunker.

In the early morning hours of 2 May 1945, telephone operator Rochus Misch and Hentschel were two of the last people remaining in the bunker complex. They exchanged letters to their wives in case anything happened to either of them. Misch then left the bunker to try to break through the Soviet army ring of the central part of the city. Hentschel stayed in the bunker after everyone else had either committed suicide or left, as the field hospital for the wounded in the Reich Chancellery above needed power and water. He surrendered to Soviet Red Army soldiers as they entered the bunker complex on 2 May and was released from captivity on 4 April 1949. Hentschel died on 27 April 1982 in Achern, West Germany at the age of 73.

== In popular culture ==
- Hentschel plays a significant role in the 1981 film The Bunker. Portrayed by Martin Jarvis, he is shown as an ordinary working man (invariably seen in overalls) who observes the disintegration of the Nazi leaders around him. Eventually he is left all alone and disillusioned in the bunker, after the departure of his friend Rochus Misch. Awaiting the arrival of the Soviets, Hentschel hears the report of Hitler's "heroic" death on the radio, and throws the papers he's been reading at the radio.
- Oliver Stritzel was cast as Hentschel in the film Downfall (Der Untergang). However, in the theatrical release most of his scenes were cut and he only briefly appears restoring power to a failing generator, as well as in the epilogue which explains what happened to all the main characters. In the extended version of the film, his performance is expanded. Hentschel tells Otto Günsche that he is staying in order to maintain the generators. Later, he goes to the surface and looks at the burnt remains of Joseph and Magda Goebbels. Returning to the bunker, he finds a group of female Soviet soldiers who ask where Hitler and Braun are, then ask to be taken to Eva's wardrobe. He asks them not to open the door to the Goebbels' room, which they do anyway and find the dead bodies of the Goebbels children. Afterwards, he leads them to another room where the soldiers comb through leftover women's clothes with excitement.
