= Magda Goebbels =

Wife of Joseph Goebbels (1901–1945)

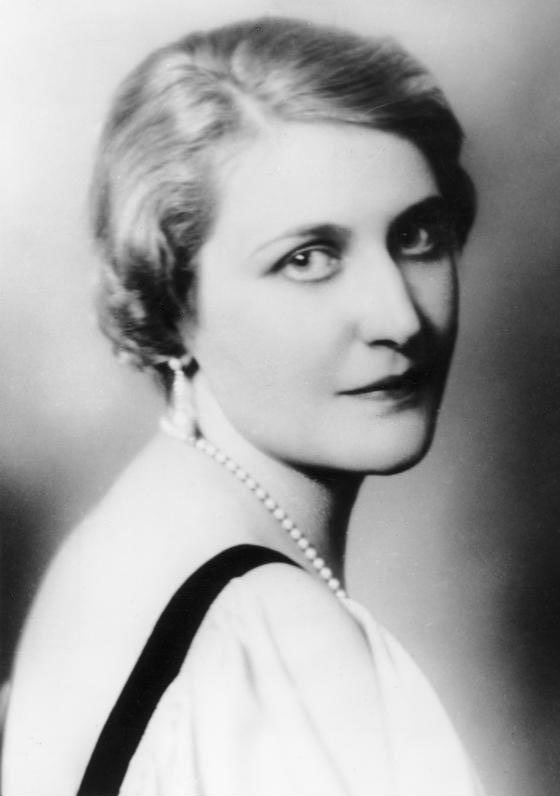
- Goebbels in 1933

Personal details
- Born: Johanna Maria Magdalena Ritschel; 11 November 1901 Berlin, Germany
- Died: 1 May 1945 (aged 43) Berlin, Germany
- Cause of death: Suicide
- Party: Nazi Party
- Spouses: Günther Quandt (m. 1921; div. 1929) Joseph Goebbels (m. 1931)
- Children: 7, including Harald
- Education: Ursuline Convent
- Awards: Golden Party Badge; Cross of Honor of the German Mother

Johanna Maria Magdalena Goebbels (née Ritschel; 11 November 1901 – 1 May 1945) was the wife of Nazi Germany's propaganda minister Joseph Goebbels. A prominent member of the Nazi Party, she was a close ally, companion, and political supporter of Adolf Hitler. Some historians refer to her as the unofficial "first lady" of Nazi Germany, while others give that title to Emmy Göring.

With defeat imminent during the Battle of Berlin at the end of World War II in Europe, she and her husband murdered their six children with a cyanide compound before committing suicide in the Reich Chancellery gardens. Her eldest son, Harald Quandt, from her previous marriage to Günther Quandt, survived her.

== Early life ==
Magda was born in 1901 in Berlin, Germany, to an unwed couple, Auguste Behrend and engineer Oskar Ritschel. The couple were married later that year and divorced in either 1904 or 1905. Some sources claim their marriage took place before Magda's birth, although there is no evidence to support it. Ritschel did not acknowledge his paternity until 1920, prior to Magda's marriage to Günther Quandt.

When Magda was five, her mother sent her to Cologne to stay with Ritschel. In 1908, her mother married Richard Friedländer, a wealthy Jewish merchant who lived in Brussels. He adopted Magda and gave her his surname. In 2016, writer and historian Oliver Hilmes traced in the Berlin archives, Friedländer's residency card, which stated that he was Magda's biological father.

In Brussels, Magda was enrolled at the Ursuline Convent in Vilvoorde where she was remembered as "an active and intelligent little girl". The family remained in Brussels from 1908 until the outbreak of World War I, at which point many Germans left Belgium. The family moved to Berlin, where Magda attended the high school Kolmorgensche Gymnasium. Behrend divorced Friedländer in 1914. While in Berlin, Magda befriended Lisa Arlosoroff and later became intimate with her brother Haim, an ardent Zionist. During her relationship with Haim, she briefly wore a Star of David he had given her and accompanied him to Jewish youth club meetings. The relationship did not last but the two remained in contact during the 1920s until Haim's migration to Mandatory Palestine, where he later headed the Jewish Agency department. Haim was assassinated in Tel Aviv in June 1933 in an unsolved murder case, possibly related to his public position in the Jewish Labor Party.

== Marriage and son with Günther Quandt ==
In 1920, while returning to school on a train, she met Günther Quandt, a rich German industrialist twice her age. Thereafter, he courted her with courtesy and grand gestures. He demanded that she change her surname back to Ritschel (after having for many years borne the surname of Friedländer), when converting from Catholicism to Quandt's Protestantism. They were married on 4 January 1921, and their first child, Harald, was born on 1 November 1921.

Magda soon grew frustrated in her marriage; Quandt spent little time with her, as his main interest was the expansion of his business empire. The couple raised six children – Harald, Quandt's two sons from a prior marriage, and three children of a deceased friend.

In October 1927, the couple went on a two-month visit to the United States, to conduct business with the Lloyd Electric Storage Battery Co. of Philadelphia. In 1929, Quandt discovered that Magda was having an affair, so they separated and divorced later in the year. The terms of the divorce were quite generous to Magda, who had discovered some of Quandt's old love letters that he did not wish made public.

== Marriage and family with Joseph Goebbels ==
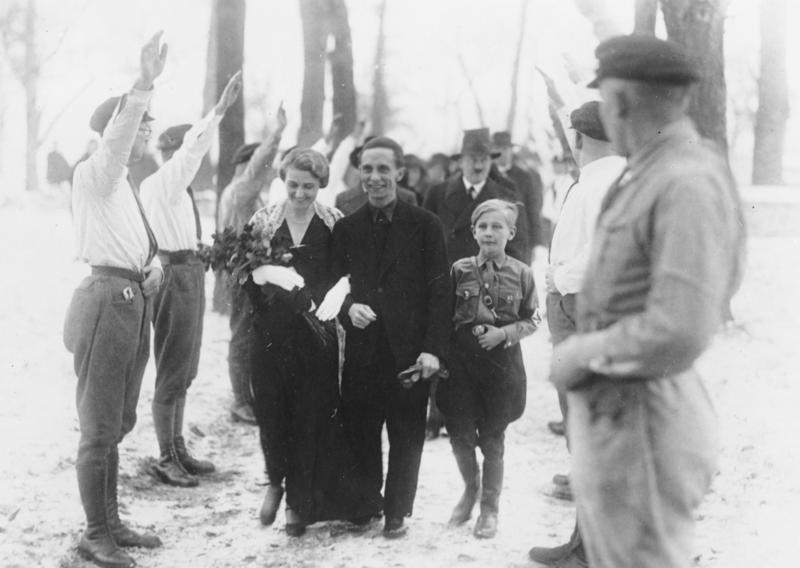
Joseph and Magda's wedding day, with her son Harald Quandt in his Deutsches Jungvolk uniform. Adolf Hitler, their best man, can be seen in the background.

In 1930, Magda attended a meeting of the Nazi Party, where she was impressed by one of the speakers, Joseph Goebbels, then the Gauleiter of Berlin. She joined the party on 1 September 1930, and became the leader of a local Nazi women's group. From the local branch, Magda moved to the party headquarters in Berlin and for a brief period became secretary to Hans Meinshausen, Goebbels' deputy, before being invited to take charge of Goebbels' own private papers. She and Goebbels became romantically involved while on a short trip with friends to Weimar in February 1931. A relationship began and by April they began making plans for their future together. Goebbels wrote in his diary, "We have made a solemn vow to each other: When we have conquered the Reich, we will become man and wife. I am very happy." Her flat on Theodor-Heuss-Platz (then named the Reichskanzlerplatz) soon became a favourite meeting place for Adolf Hitler and other Nazi officials.

By September, the Goebbels relationship was experiencing problems. Goebbels was often jealous, and had some concern over Hitler's fondness for Magda. Magda decided to advance their wedding date, and the couple were married on 19 December 1931, with Hitler as a witness. Otto Wagener claims that Magda's marriage to Goebbels was somewhat arranged; since Hitler intended to remain unmarried, it was suggested that as the wife of a leading and highly visible Nazi official she might eventually act as "first lady of the Third Reich". Magda was an ambitious woman with social connections and upper class bearing that may have influenced Goebbels' own enthusiasm. Goebbels biographer Peter Longerich concurred with this "plausible" conclusion. Meissner contends that Hitler (though undoubtedly impressed by Magda) was an exceptionally close friend of the couple in the early days. Hitler grew very fond of the Goebbels' six children and enjoyed staying at their Berlin apartment, where he could relax and would often arrive there late at night, sitting and talking with Goebbels, with their baby Helga (born 1932) on his lap.

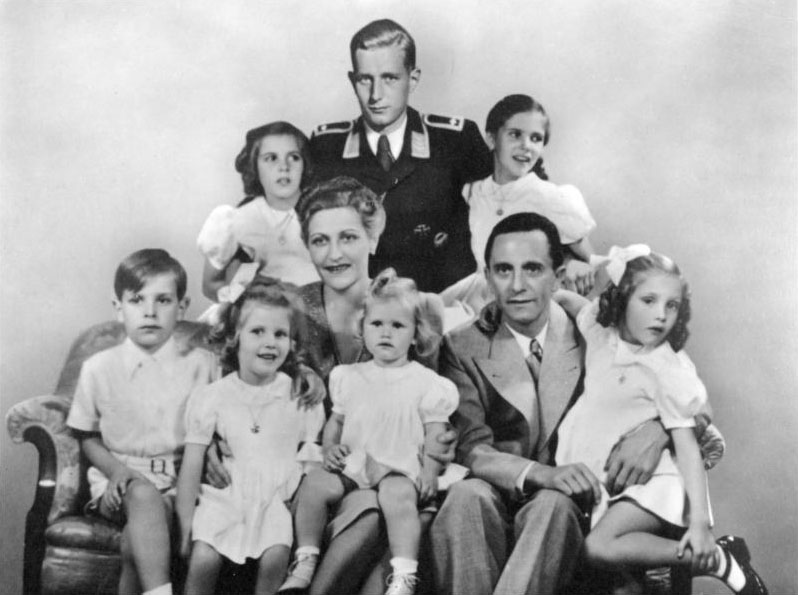
The Goebbels family in 1942: (back row) Hilde, Harald Quandt, Helga; (front row) Helmut, Hedda, Magda, Heide, Joseph and Holde

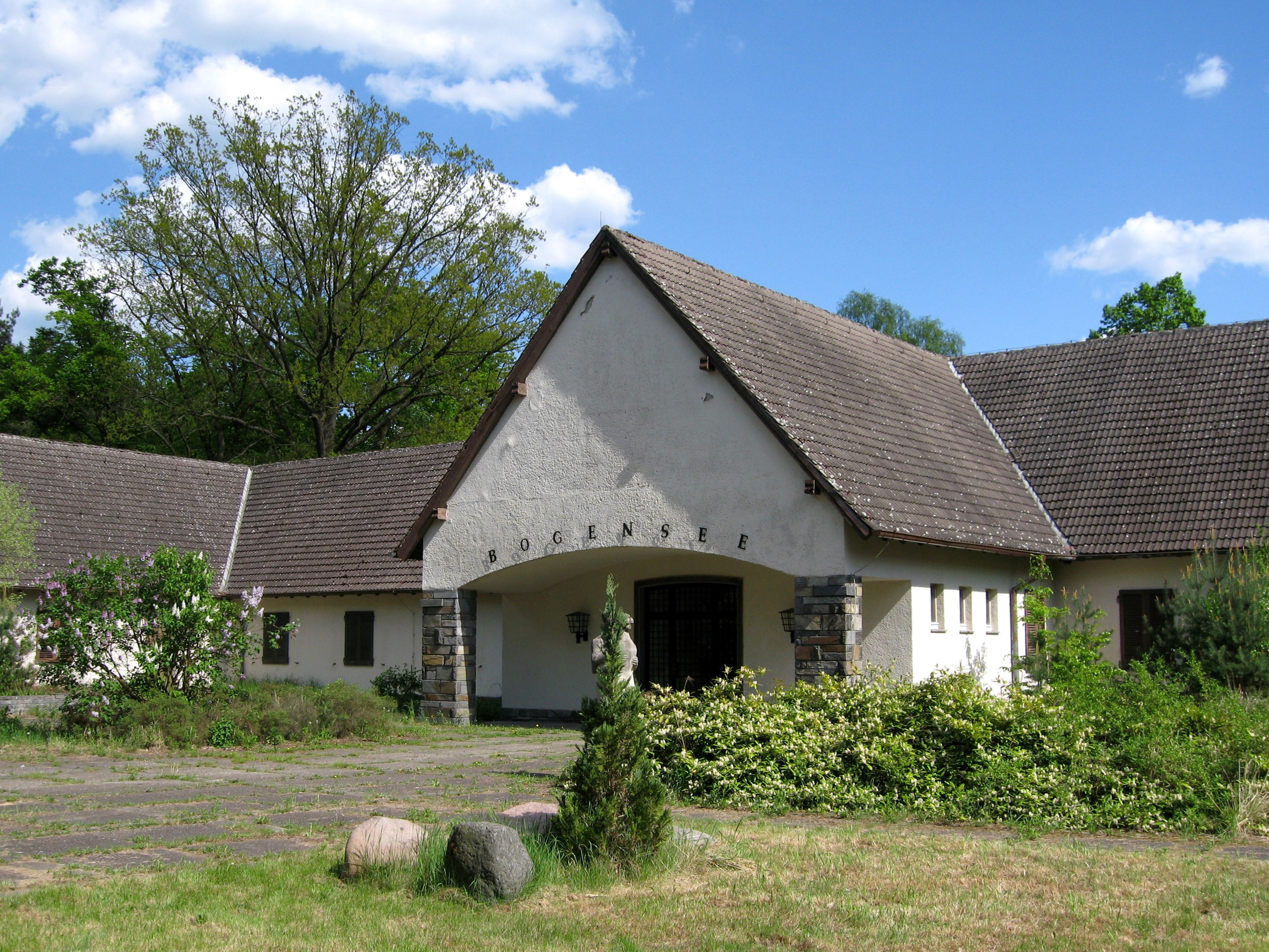
Goebbels' villa on Bogensee (2008)

Magda had thus a close relationship with Hitler, and became a member of his small coterie of female friends. She acted as an unofficial representative of the regime, receiving letters from all over Germany from women with questions about domestic matters or child custody issues. After 1933, the Goebbels family became accustomed to the luxurious lifestyle which went with their high social position. Their Berlin home on Göringstrasse was remodeled by Albert Speer and they spent the spring and summers in Kladow. In 1936, they bought a villa on Schwanenwerder island and later another at Bogensee near Wandlitz in Brandenburg.

Joseph and Magda Goebbels had six children: Helga (1932), Hilde (1934), Helmut (1935), Holde (1937), Hedda (1938), and Heide (1940). Joseph Goebbels had many affairs during the marriage. In 1936, Goebbels met the Czech actress Lída Baarová and by the winter of 1937 began an intense affair with her. Magda had a long conversation with Hitler about the situation on 15 August 1938. Unwilling to put up with a scandal involving one of his top ministers, Hitler demanded that Goebbels break off the relationship. Thereafter, Goebbels and Magda seemed to reach a truce until the end of September. The couple had another falling out at that point, and once again Hitler became involved, insisting the couple stay together. Hitler arranged for publicity photos to be taken of himself with the reconciled couple in October 1938. (Note: In 1939 at the premiere of the film The Journey to Tilsit, Magda ostentatiously left because the plot had an accidental resemblance to her situation and the affair between her husband and Baarová. (Romani 1994, p. 86)) Magda also had affairs, including relationships with Kurt Ludecke in 1933 and Karl Hanke in 1938.

== War years ==
At the outbreak of war, Magda's son by her first marriage, Harald Quandt, became a Luftwaffe pilot and fought at the front, while, at home, she lived up to the image of a patriotic mother by training as a Red Cross nurse and working with the electronics company Telefunken, and travelled to work on a bus, like her colleagues. She was also involved with entertaining the wives of foreign heads of state, supporting the troops and comforting war widows.

Both Goebbels and Magda derived personal benefits and social status from their close association with Hitler, and the couple remained loyal to Hitler and publicly supported him. Privately, however, Magda expressed doubts, especially after the war began to go badly on the Eastern Front. On 9 November 1942, during a gathering with friends listening to a speech by Hitler, she switched off the radio exclaiming, "My God, what a lot of rubbish." In 1944, she reportedly said of Hitler, "He no longer listens to voices of reason. Those who tell him what he wants to hear are the only ones he believes." There is no evidence that Magda attempted to intervene to save her Jewish stepfather from the Holocaust; he was deported to Buchenwald in 1938 and died soon after. Asked about her husband's antisemitism, she answered: "The Führer wants it thus, and Joseph must obey."

Felix Franks, a German Jew who later became a British soldier, claimed that his grandparents got an exit visa from Germany with the help of Magda Goebbels:

My father and step-mother were left behind in Germany but, two days before the War started, they were asked to come to Gestapo Headquarters and given an exit visa. There is a story in the family which goes back to the First World War when my step-grandparents were asked to give shelter to a young woman who'd been displaced by the war in Belgium. Although she had a Jewish step-father, she eventually married Joseph Goebbels! My stepmother believes she may have acted as a sort of protecting hand and was involved with the exit visa. Certainly, the night before Kristallnacht, they got an anonymous phone call warning my father not to go home that evening but to go somewhere safe. My step-mother swore it was Magda Goebbels.

Afflicted with a weak heart and "delicate health", Magda had extended periods of illness. Towards the end of the war, she suffered from depression and trigeminal neuralgia. She was often bedridden, and was hospitalized as late as August 1944.

== Death ==
In late April 1945, the Soviet Red Army entered Berlin, and the Goebbels family moved into the Vorbunker, connected to the lower Führerbunker under the Reich Chancellery garden. Magda wrote a farewell letter to her son Harald, who was in a POW camp in North Africa:

Harald! My beloved son! By now we have been in the Führerbunker for six days already—daddy, your six little siblings and I, for the sake of giving our national socialistic lives the only possible honourable end... You shall know that I stayed here against daddy's will, and that even on last Sunday the Führer wanted to help me to get out. You know your mother—we have the same blood, for me there was no wavering. Our glorious idea is ruined and with it everything beautiful and marvelous that I have known in my life. The world that comes after the Führer and national socialism is not any longer worth living in and therefore I took the children with me, for they are too good for the life that would follow, and a merciful God will understand me when I will give them the salvation... The children are wonderful... there never is a word of complaint nor crying. The impacts are shaking the bunker. The elder kids cover the younger ones, their presence is a blessing and they are making the Führer smile once in a while. May God help that I have the strength to perform the last and hardest. We only have one goal left: loyalty to the Führer even in death. Harald, my dear son—I want to give you what I learned in life: be loyal! Loyal to yourself, loyal to the people and loyal to your country... Be proud of us and try to keep us in dear memory...

Goebbels added a postscript to Hitler's last will and testament of 29 April 1945 stating that he would disobey the order to leave Berlin, "[f]or reasons of humanity and personal loyalty". Further, he stated that Magda and their children supported his refusal to leave Berlin and his resolution to die in the bunker. He later qualified this by stating that the children would support the decision [to commit suicide] if they were old enough to speak for themselves.

Magda was among the last to see both Hitler and Eva Braun before they committed suicide on the afternoon of 30 April 1945. On the following day, 1 May, Magda and Joseph arranged for SS dentist Helmut Kunz to inject their six children with morphine so that when they were unconscious, an ampule of cyanide could be then crushed in each of their mouths. Kunz later stated he gave the children morphine injections, but it was Magda and SS-Obersturmbannführer Ludwig Stumpfegger (Hitler's personal doctor) who administered the cyanide. Author James P. O'Donnell concluded that although Stumpfegger was probably involved in drugging the children, Magda killed them herself. The subsequent Soviet autopsy of 12 year old Helga noted bruises on her body, but did not specifically state where. O'Donnell surmised this showed that Helga had struggled for life before dying.

Magda appears to have contemplated and talked about killing her children a month in advance. According to her friend and sister-in-law (from her first marriage) Ello Quandt, she told her that they were all going to take poison.

We have demanded monstrous things from the German people, treated other nations with pitiless cruelty. For this the victors will exact their full revenge...we can't let them think we are cowards. Everybody else has the right to live. We haven't got this right—we have forfeited it. I make myself responsible. I belonged. I believed in Hitler and for long enough in Joseph Goebbels...Suppose I remain alive, I should immediately be arrested and interrogated about Joseph. If I tell the truth I must reveal what sort of man he was—must describe all that happened behind the scenes. Then any respectable person would turn from me in disgust. It would be equally impossible to do the opposite—that is to defend what he has done, to justify him to his enemies, to speak up for him out of true conviction...That would go against my conscience. So you see, Ello, it would be quite impossible for me to go on living. We will take the children with us, they are too good, too lovely for the world which lies ahead. In the days to come Joseph will be regarded as one of the greatest criminals that Germany has ever produced. His children would hear that said daily, people would torment them, despise and humiliate them. They would have to bear the burden of his sins and vengeance would be wreaked on them... It has all happened before. You know how I told you at the time quite frankly what the Führer said in the Café Anast in Munich when he saw the little Jewish boy, you remember? That he would like to squash him flat like a bug on the wall...I couldn't believe it and thought it was just provocative talk. But he really did it later. It was all so unspeakably gruesome...

Magda appears to have refused several offers, such as one by Albert Speer, to have the children smuggled out of Berlin and insisted that the family must stay at her husband's side. In the Führerbunker she confided to Hitler's secretary Traudl Junge that "I would rather have my children die, than live in disgrace, jeered at. My children stand no chance in Germany after the war". The last surviving member of Hitler's entourage in the bunker, Rochus Misch, gave this account of the events to the BBC:

Straight after Hitler's death, Mrs. Goebbels came down to the bunker with her children. She started preparing to kill them. She couldn't have done that above ground—there were other people there who would have stopped her. That's why she came downstairs—because no-one else was allowed in the bunker. She came down on purpose to kill them.

Magda helped the girls change into long white nightgowns. She then softly combed their hair. Misch tried to concentrate on his work, but he knew what was going to happen. Magda then went back up to the Vorbunker with the children. Shortly thereafter, Werner Naumann came down to the Führerbunker and told Misch that he had seen Hitler's personal physician, Dr Stumpfegger, give the children something "sweetened" to drink. About two hours later, Magda came back down to the Führerbunker, alone. She looked very pale, her eyes very red and her face was "frozen". She sat down at a table and began playing patience. Goebbels then came over to her, but did not say a word at that time.

After their children were dead, Magda and Joseph Goebbels walked up to the garden of the Chancellery, where they committed suicide. There are several different accounts of this event. One account was that they each bit on a cyanide ampule near where Hitler had been buried, and were given a coup de grâce immediately afterwards. Goebbels' SS adjutant Günther Schwägermann testified in 1948 that they walked ahead of him up the stairs and out into the Chancellery garden. He waited in the stairwell and heard the shots sound. Schwägermann then walked up the remaining stairs and, once outside, saw their lifeless bodies. Following Goebbels' prior order, Schwägermann had an SS soldier fire several shots into Goebbels' body to ensure he was dead. (Note: Johannes Hentschel later told Misch a singular conflicting story that Goebbels killed himself in his room in the bunker, and Magda in the Vorbunker, during the early hours of 2 May. (Misch 2014, pp. 182, 183)) The bodies were doused with petrol and were only partly burned.

The charred corpses were found on the afternoon of 2 May 1945 by Soviet troops. Magda's face was unrecognizable compared to that of her husband. According to the purported Soviet autopsy of her body, her jawbones and dental remains were found "detached in the oral cavity". (Note: These were presented by the Federal Security Service in Moscow's Lubyanka Building in the 2004 documentary Death in the Bunker: The True Story of Hitler's Downfall.) The children were found in the Vorbunker dressed in their nightclothes, with ribbons tied in the girls' hair. The remains of the Goebbels' family, General Hans Krebs, and Hitler's dogs were repeatedly buried and exhumed. The last burial was at the SMERSH facility in Magdeburg on 21 February 1946. In 1970, KGB director Yuri Andropov authorised an operation to destroy the remains. On 4 April 1970, a Soviet KGB team used detailed burial charts to exhume five wooden boxes at the Magdeburg facility. The remains from the boxes were burned, crushed, and scattered into the Biederitz river, a tributary of the nearby Elbe.
