= Erna Flegel =

German nurse (1911–2006)

- Born: 11 July 1911; Germany
- Died: 16 February 2006 (aged 94); Mölln, Schleswig-Holstein, Germany
- Occupation: Nurse

Erna Flegel (11 July 1911 – 16 February 2006) was a German nurse during World War II. In late April 1945 she worked at the emergency casualty station at the Reich Chancellery in Berlin, and was one of the final occupants of the Führerbunker before she was captured by the Red Army on 2 May 1945.

== Biography ==
From January 1943 until the end of World War II, as well as during the Battle of Berlin, Flegel was a nurse for Hitler's entourage. She worked alongside one of Hitler's physicians, Werner Haase, as a nurse at Humboldt University Hospital and was transferred to the Reich Chancellery in late April 1945. She worked in an emergency casualty station located in the large Reich Chancellery cellar, above the Vorbunker and Führerbunker.

In 2003, R.J. Defalque published an article in the Bulletin of Anesthesia History in which he discussed the surgeries conducted by Ernst-Günther Schenck, and his last days in Berlin in the Führerbunker. In this article, Defalque shares Schenck's recollections, including his work with Haase and "nurse Erna" whom Defalque later identified as Erna Flegel. In the absence of Haase, Schenck and Flegel worked together to help wounded people entering the bunker complex, and Flegel is described as "stolid woman who does not flinch as she dresses the hideous injuries of the wounded".

During her time in the bunker complex, she befriended Magda Goebbels, but spoke more negatively of Eva Braun, Hitler's companion, which was reiterated in a 2006 book on Braun. Flegel also helped care for the Goebbels children whom she found "charming"; she could not forgive Magda Goebbels for her role in their murder. Hitler's SS aide, Otto Günsche, presented the War Merit Cross (Kriegsverdienstkreuz) 2nd class to Flegel and others for their emergency medical services for wounded German soldiers and civilians. In Schenck's memoirs, he describes meeting Hitler with Flegel and Haase as Hitler wanted to thank them for their emergency medical services. In a 2015 book detailing Hitler's last day, Flegel is described as being hysterical when called upon to say goodbye to Hitler.

Thereafter, Flegel returned to work at the emergency casualty station. She remained there along with Haase, Helmut Kunz and a fellow nurse, Liselotte Chervinska, making them final occupants of the Führerbunker; they were all taken prisoner by the Soviet Red Army on 2 May and brought to NKGB headquarters at the German Institute for the Blind. Flegel was quickly released and stated that the Soviet troops treated her well. She stayed in the bunker complex another six to ten days before leaving. She was interrogated in November 1945 by Frederick Stalder, an aide to Richard Helms, then an Office of Strategic Services operative in Berlin. The interview was released by the Central Intelligence Agency in 1981 after it was found in the US National Archives by Miriam Kleiman and then obtained by James Kahn who returned the documents to Helms. The notes accompanying the interview note that the final days of the activity within the Führerbunker was of interest to westerners and "none depicted the final days more graphically than Erna Flegel", and Helms himself notes the interview was "solid history".

In 2005, Flegel gave an interview to the media who tracked her down to her residence, a nursing home in Germany. The Guardian published an analysis of the interview. Following the 2005 interview, the press around took interest in the interview with subsequent articles in papers in the United States, Germany, and Australia. In July 2005, The Washington Post compared Arnold Weiss's statements at the end of his life to Flegel's statements as both did not want to take their secrets to the grave. There was also commentary on the interview with differing opinions as to whether or not she provided new information about the final days in the Führerbunker. She died in Mölln in 2006, aged 94.

== See also ==
- Downfall, 2004 German film where she is portrayed by actress Elizaveta Boyarskaya
