= Goebbels children =

Six children of Joseph and Magda Goebbels

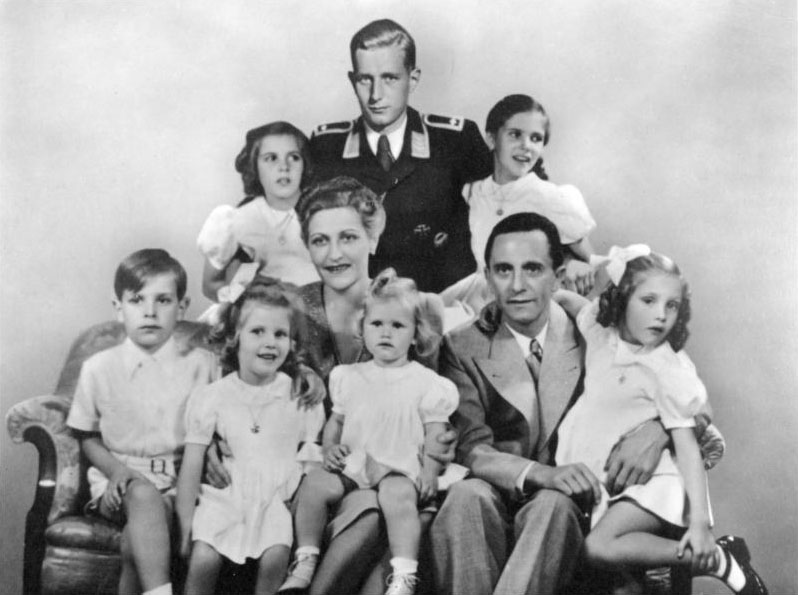
The Goebbels family in 1942: (back row) Hildegard, Harald Quandt, Helga; (front row) Helmut, Hedwig, Magda, Heidrun, Joseph and Holdine.

The Goebbels children were the five daughters and one son born to Nazi propaganda minister Joseph Goebbels and his wife Magda. The children, born between 1932 and 1940, were murdered by their parents in Berlin on 1 May 1945, the day both parents committed suicide.

There are different theories of how they were killed; the most supported theory is that they were murdered with cyanide capsules given to them by their mother or by another person acting according to their mother’s orders.

Magda Goebbels had an elder son, Harald Quandt, from a previous marriage to Günther Quandt. Harald, then aged 23, was a prisoner of war when his younger half-siblings were killed.

== Naming ==
Some historian writers have contended that the children's names all begin with "H" as a tribute to Adolf Hitler, who was fond of all the children, but there is no evidence to support this; rather, it supports that Magda's "H" naming was the idea of her first husband, Günther Quandt, who chose names beginning with "H" for his other two children by his first wife. This claim is supported by Magda's mother, Auguste Behrend, who stated that the family made an innocent hobby of searching for new baby names beginning with "H" for each successive child.

== Children ==
=== Helga Susanne ===
Born on 1 September 1932, Helga was a "daddy's girl" who preferred her father to her mother. She would sit in her father's lap after he came home. It was not unusual for Hitler, who was fond of the children, to take her on to his own lap while he talked late into the night. She was photographed with Hilde presenting Hitler with flowers on 20 April 1936, his birthday.

Helga was twelve years old when she was murdered. Bruises found on her body postmortem (mostly on her face) led to wide speculation that she had struggled against receiving a cyanide capsule, which was used to kill her by crushing it between her teeth.

=== Hildegard Traudel ===
Born on 13 April 1934, Hildegard was commonly called "Hilde". In a 1941 diary entry, Joseph referred to her as "a little mouse". She was photographed with Helga presenting Hitler with flowers on 20 April 1936, his birthday. Hilde was eleven years old at the time of her murder.

=== Helmut Christian ===
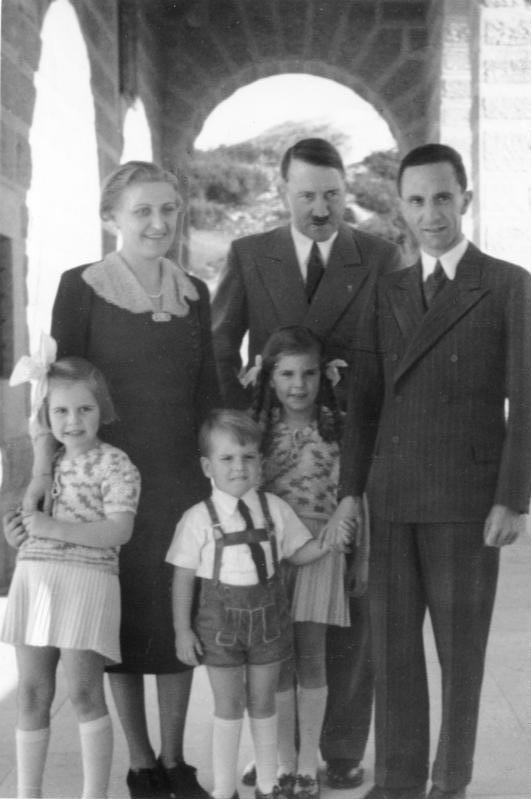
Magda and Joseph Goebbels with their children, Hilde (left), Helmut (center), and Helga (right), visit Hitler on the Obersalzberg, Kehlstein House, 1938.

Born on 2 October 1935, Helmut was considered sensitive and something of a dreamer. In his diary, Goebbels called him a "clown". When his teacher at the Lanke primary school reported, to his father's dismay, that his promotion to a higher form was doubtful, he responded well to intense tutoring from his mother and his governess and achieved promotion to the next grade. He wore braces on his teeth.

On 26 April 1945, Helmut repeated to Hitler his father's birthday speech, and responded to Helga's protests that he was copying their father by arguing that, no, their father had copied "what he said".

On 30 April 1945, the boy was rude to a 15-year-old nurse who tended to the wounded in the bunker complex. The nurse, Johanna Ruf, slapped young Helmut. She did not know the boy was the son of Goebbels until later. Later that day, Hitler's secretary Traudl Junge stated that while she was with the children in the Führerbunker they heard the sound of Hitler's self-inflicted gunshot. Helmut, who mistook it for the sound of a mortar landing nearby, shouted, "That was a bullseye!" Helmut was nine years old at the time of his murder.

=== Holdine Kathrin ===
Born on 19 February 1937, Holdine was commonly called "Holde". It is claimed that she got her name when the doctor who delivered her, Stoeckel, bent over her and exclaimed, "Das ist eine Holde!" ("That's a pretty one!") Meissner claims that Holde was the "least lively" of the children and somewhat "pushed aside" by the others, to her considerable distress, and that Goebbels responded to this by making her something of a favorite, to which she responded with devotion. She was eight years old at the time of her murder.

=== Hedwig Johanna ===
Born on 5 May 1938, Hedwig was commonly called "Hedda". She insisted, in 1944, that when she grew up she was going to marry SS Adjutant Günther Schwägermann, having been captivated by the fact he had a fake eye. She was six years old, four days short of her seventh birthday, at the time of her murder.

=== Heidrun Elisabeth ===
Born on 29 October 1940, Heidrun was commonly called "Heide". Heidrun shared a birthday with her father. She was called "the reconciliation child" because she was conceived after her parents reconciled. Rochus Misch described her as a "little flirt" and said she frequently joked with him in the bunker. Heide was four years old at the time of her murder.

== Harald Quandt ==
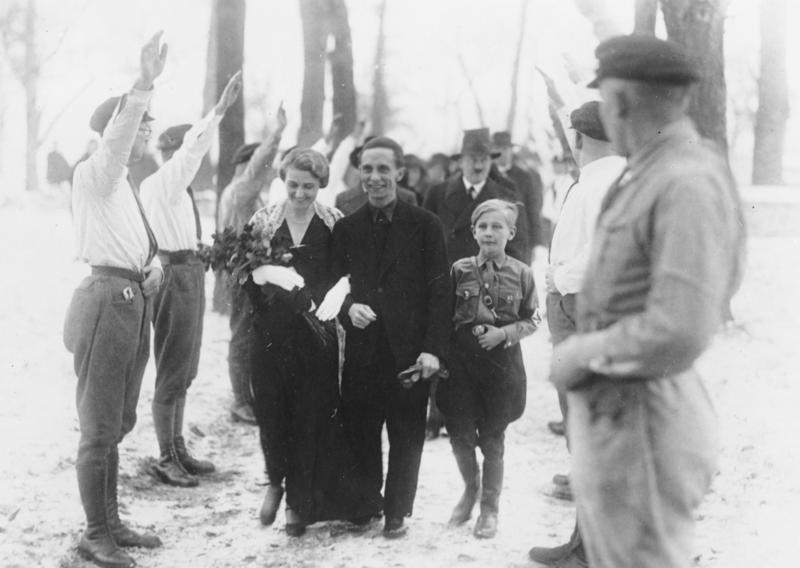
Ten-year-old Harald Quandt (in DJ-uniform) at his mother's wedding with Joseph Goebbels. Hitler, who acted as a witness, can be seen in the background.

Magda and Günther Quandt were married on 4 January 1921, and her first child, Harald Quandt, was born on 1 November 1921. Magda and Günther Quandt's marriage ended in divorce in 1929. Magda joined the Nazi Party on 1 September 1930, and did some volunteer work, although she has not been characterized as politically active. From the local branch, she moved to the party headquarters in Berlin and was invited to take charge of Goebbels' own private papers. She and Goebbels first became romantically involved while on a short trip with friends to Weimar, Germany, in February 1931. The couple were married on 19 December 1931, with Hitler as a witness.

Harald not only attended his mother's wedding to Goebbels but also formed quite an attachment with him; sometimes accompanying him to gatherings, standing on the platform near to "Uncle Joseph", wearing his Hitler Youth uniform. After his appointment as minister, Goebbels demanded that Harald's father release Magda from her obligation under their divorce settlement, to send Harald to live with him in the event of her remarriage; by 1934, Harald moved completely to the Goebbelses' household.

Harald later served as a lieutenant in the Luftwaffe. He was Magda's only child to survive the Second World War and went on to become a leading West German industrialist. Harald died when his personal aircraft crashed in Italy, 22 September 1967; he was survived by his wife and five children.

== Family life ==
In 1934, in search for privacy for himself and his family, Goebbels bought an imposing house in its own grounds on Schwanenwerder, an island in the River Havel. He also bought a motor yacht, Baldur, for use on the river. Harald had his own nursery on the first floor while Helga and Hilde shared another. The children not only had ponies, but also a little carriage in which to ride around the gardens. Two years later he purchased a neighboring property and extended the park, and included a private "citadel" as his own personal retreat.

Later, the City of Berlin placed a second lakeside house at his disposal, Lanke am Bogensee, as an official residence, which was only large enough for the family to use as a weekend retreat. Goebbels later added a large modern house on the opposite shore of the Bogensee.

The marriage reached a crisis point in the late summer of 1938 over Goebbels' affair with Czechoslovak actress Lída Baarová. Hitler himself intervened, for he was unwilling to put up with a scandal involving one of his top ministers, and demanded that Goebbels break off the relationship. Thereafter Joseph and Magda seemed to reach a truce until the end of September. The couple had another falling out at that point, and once again Hitler became involved, insisting the couple stay together. Hitler negotiated an agreement whereby the actress would be banished and the couple would keep up public appearances, subject to any reasonable conditions Magda might make. One of her conditions was that Goebbels would only be able to visit Schwanenwerder and see the children with her express permission. If, after that year, Magda still wanted a divorce, Hitler would allow it, with Goebbels as the guilty party, and she would retain Schwanenwerder, custody of the children, and a considerable income. Goebbels abided scrupulously by the agreement, always calling for permission before visiting and expressing his regret at missing Magda if she was not there, or taking his place, amiably, with his family at the tea table, if she was. It is claimed that the children did not seem to be aware that their parents were living separately at this time.

== In the media ==
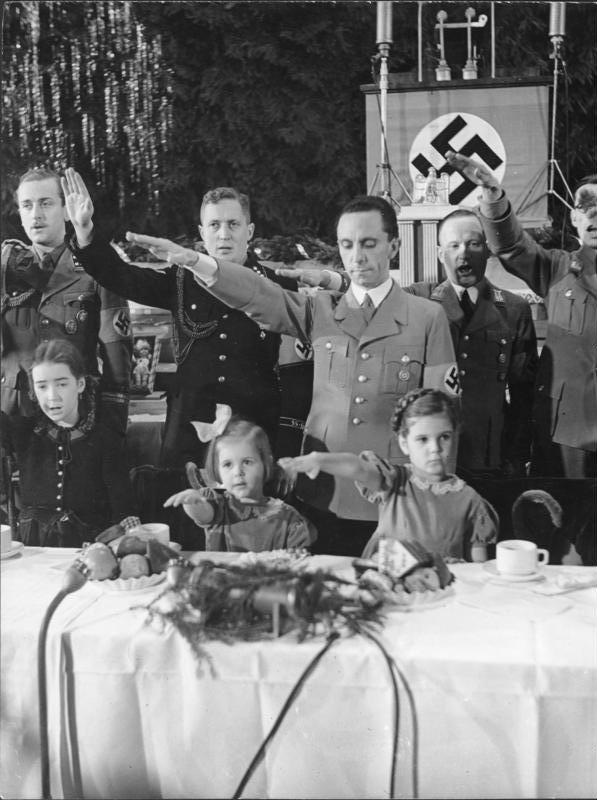
Joseph Goebbels with his daughters, Hilde (center) and Helga (right), at a Christmas celebration in the Saalbau (Hall) Friedrichshain, Berlin, 1937, during the singing of the national anthems

In 1937, Helga and Hilde were photographed with their father at the Berlin Frühjahrsregatta.

The public reconciliation agreement in August 1938 was cemented by the appearance of Helga, Hilde and Helmut with their parents in front of the cameras of UFA, as a cinematic image of domestic reconciliation.

In 1939, Goebbels used a concealed camera to film his children as a "healthy" contrast to the disabled children in a propaganda film intended to promote the Action T4, euthanasia of disabled children.

During 1942, the children appeared 34 times in the weekly newsreels, going about their lives, helping their mother, playing in the garden or singing to their father on his 45th birthday. That October, as a gift from the German Newsreel Company, Goebbels was presented with a film of his children playing.

On 18 February 1943, Helga and Hilde were photographed along with Magda at one of Joseph's best-known events, the total war speech.

Towards the end of 1944, Goebbels sent Magda and his two eldest daughters into a military hospital to be filmed for the weekly newsreels, but abandoned the project on realizing that seeing the terrible injuries of the soldiers was too traumatic for his daughters.

== Last days ==
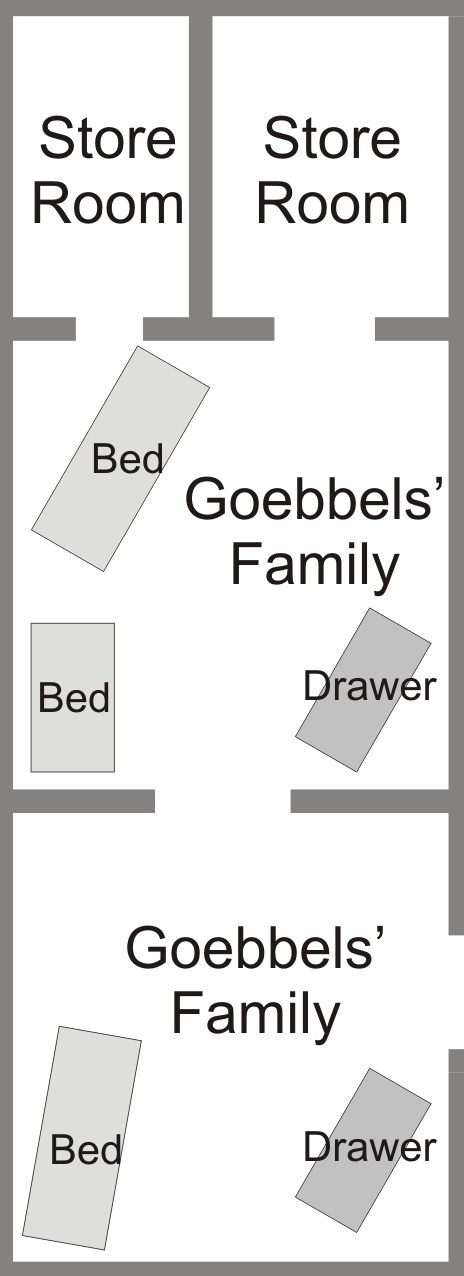
Floor plan of their Vorbunker room

As the Red Army moved closer at the end of January 1945, Goebbels ordered that his family be moved from the Lanke estate to the relative safety of Schwanenwerder. From there, the children would soon hear the rumble of artillery in the east, and wonder why rain never followed the "thunder".

By 22 April 1945, the day before the Red Army entered the outskirts of Berlin, the Goebbels moved their children into the Vorbunker, connected to the lower Führerbunker under the Reich Chancellery garden in central Berlin. He and Magda may have previously discussed suicide and the fate of their young children in a long meeting on the night of 27 January. Hitler and a few personnel were staying in the Führerbunker to direct the final defence of Berlin. German Red Cross leader SS-Gruppenführer Karl Gebhardt wanted to take the children out of the city with him, but was dismissed.

General Bernd Freytag von Loringhoven later described the children as "sad", but nurse Erna Flegel, with whom they had much contact in the bunker, characterised them as "charming" and "absolutely delightful". They are reported to have played with Hitler's dog Blondi during their time in the bunker complex, where they slept in a single room. While many reports suggest there were three separate bunk beds, secretary Traudl Junge insisted there were only two. The children are said to have sung in unison while in the bunker, performing for both Hitler and the injured Robert Ritter von Greim, as well as having been conducted in play-song by pilot Hanna Reitsch. Junge said she was with the children on the afternoon of 30 April, when Hitler and Eva Braun killed themselves.

== Murder ==
As the advancing Soviet troops reached Berlin there was much discussion in the Führerbunker by the higher German officials about suicide as a means to escape the inevitable execution and humiliation by the Soviets.

Magda Goebbels refused several offers from others, such as Albert Speer, to take the children out of Berlin and appears to have contemplated and talked about killing her children at least a month in advance. After the war, Günther Quandt's sister-in-law Eleanore recalled Magda saying she did not want her children to grow up hearing that their father had been one of the century's foremost criminals and that reincarnation might grant her children a better future life.

Joseph Goebbels added a postscript to Hitler's last will and testament, stating that he would disobey the order to leave Berlin: "For reasons of humanity and personal loyalty" he had to stay. Further, his wife and their children supported his refusal to leave Berlin and his resolution to die in the bunker. He later qualified this by claiming that the children would support the decision (to commit suicide) if they were old enough to speak for themselves. Both pilot Hanna Reitsch (who had left the bunker on 29 April) and Junge (who left on 1 May) carried letters to the outside world from those remaining. Included was a letter from Magda to Harald, who was in an Allied POW camp.

On the evening of 1 May, Magda and Joseph Goebbels arranged for an SS dentist, Helmut Kunz, to inject their six children with morphine so that when they were unconscious, an ampule of a cyanide compound could be then crushed in each of their mouths. According to Kunz's later testimony, he gave the children morphine injections but Magda and SS-Obersturmbannführer Ludwig Stumpfegger, Hitler's personal doctor, administered the cyanide.

Rochus Misch, the bunker telephone/radio operator, stated that Werner Naumann told him that he had seen Hitler's personal physician, Dr Stumpfegger, give the children something "sweetened" to drink. Naumann also stated that the children were told they would be leaving for Berchtesgaden in the morning, and Stumpfegger provided Magda with the "soporific drug" to sedate them. Nurse Erna Flegel claims that Magda reassured the children about the morphine by telling them that they needed inoculations because they would be staying in the bunker for a long time. Author James P. O'Donnell concluded that, although Stumpfegger was probably involved in drugging the children, Magda killed them herself.

The children seemed unaware of the impending danger, but the eldest child, Helga, seemed to sense what was about to occur. Misch was among the last to see the children alive. They were seated around a table in his work area as their mother combed their hair and kissed them, all wearing nightgowns as it was close to their bedtime. Heide, the youngest, had scrambled up onto the table. Helga, whom Misch called the brightest of the children, was "sobbing softly". Misch felt Helga had little fondness for her mother. Magda had to push Helga towards the stairs that led up to the Vorbunker. Four-year-old Heide, who had tonsillitis and wore a scarf around her neck, turned back to look at Misch, giggling, and teasingly said, "Misch, Misch, du bist ein Fisch" ("Misch, Misch, you are a fish"), just before her mother led her and her siblings upstairs. Misch recalled later that he suspected what was about to happen and would always regret not intervening.

== Aftermath ==
On 3 May 1945, the day after Soviet troops led by Lt. Col. Ivan Klimenko had discovered the burned bodies of their parents in the courtyard above, they found the children down in the Vorbunker dressed in their night clothes, with ribbons tied in the girls' hair.

Vice Admiral Hans Voss was brought to the Chancellery garden to identify the bodies, as was Hans Fritzsche, a leading German radio commentator who had answered directly to Goebbels. Their bodies were brought to the Buchau Cemetery in Berlin for autopsy and inquest by Soviet doctors. Thereafter, the remains of the Goebbels family, General Krebs, and Hitler's dogs (thought to be Blondi and her offspring, Wulf) were repeatedly buried and exhumed. The last burial was at the SMERSH facility in Magdeburg on 21 February 1946. Auguste Behrend, the children's maternal grandmother, never knew what became of the bodies despite repeated attempts to find out.

In 1970, KGB director Yuri Andropov authorised an operation to destroy the remains. On 4 April 1970, a Soviet KGB team used detailed burial charts to exhume five wooden boxes at the Magdeburg SMERSH facility. The remains from the boxes were burned, crushed, and scattered into the Biederitz River, a tributary of the nearby Elbe.

In 2005, Rochus Misch attracted controversy when he called for a memorial plaque to be installed in honour of the six Goebbels children. Critics felt it would taint the memory of Holocaust victims to honor the children of the Nazi leader. Despite their parents' crimes, Misch argued that the children themselves were completely innocent. He reasoned that to treat them as criminals like their parents and thus deserving of the world's collective posthumous opprobrium was wrong, given that no one has a choice as to who they are biologically related to. He felt they were murdered just as other victims during the war were murdered.

== In popular culture ==
- The Goebbels children make an appearance in the 1981 war film The Bunker.
- The 1997 historical fiction book The Karnau Tapes by German author Marcel Beyer was told from the point of view of Helga Susanne and a fictionalized version of the real bodyguard Hermann Karnau.
  - The 2017 graphic novel Voices in the Dark, by Ulli Lust, was based on The Karnau Tapes.
- In the 2004 film Downfall (Der Untergang)
  - Helga Susanne was played by Aline Sokar
  - Hildegard Traudel was played by Charlotte Stoiber
  - Helmut Christian was played by Gregory Borlein
  - Holdine Kathrin was played by Laura Borlein
  - Hedwig Johanna was played by Julia Bauer
  - Heidrun Elisabeth was played by Amelie Menges

The film also presented the theory that Magda Goebbels was directly responsible for the poisonings, crushing cyanide capsules in their mouths after Ludwig Stumpfegger had given each of them an oral solution to put them to sleep (in contrast to the morphine injections they were said to have received). In the film, the eldest child, Helga, is shown being forced to drink the oral solution by her mother and Stumpfegger, while the other children drink it willingly.

- In the 2005 documentary The Goebbels Experiment, directed by Lutz Hachmeister and narrated by Kenneth Branagh, archival footage of the children is shown at the beginning and end of the film.
- The 2010 historical fiction novel Chocolate Cake with Hitler by Emma Craigie tells the story of the children's last days in the bunker through the eyes of Helga Goebbels.
- The 2011 novel Szóste najmłodsze ("The Sixth, the Youngest") by Józef Hen tells a story of the youngest daughter, Heide, who was found alive in the streets of Berlin.
- The 2011 historical fiction young adult novel The Girl in the Bunker by Tracey Rosenberg is narrated by Helga Susanne, and tells the story of the children's final days in the bunker.
- The 1988 alternate history novel Moon of Ice, by Brad Linaweaver, set in a world where Germany won World War II, depicts a surviving adult, Hildegard "Hilde" Traudel, who rebels against her father, becomes an anarchist, and threatens to go public with Goebbels' incriminating diaries describing the apocalyptic ambitions of Nazis adhering to the Welteislehre occultism of Hanns Hörbiger.
- In another alternate history novel, 1992's Fatherland by Robert Harris, set in an alternate 1964, where Germany won the war, the Goebbels children are all alive as adults, working in high positions in the Nazi state administration.
- The 2018 music video So Long, Farewell by the band Laibach is a take on the song from the musical The Sound of Music. It depicts a family of Nazi officials eating dinner in a bunker, surrounded by symbols of fascism. The video ends with the children being led into the basement, presumably to their deaths.
- The 2023 book Holly by Stephen King mentions the murder of the Goebbels children in section 4 of the chapter July 29, 2021.
- In the 2024 film Führer und Verführer the children are played by actors.
