= The Death of Adolf Hitler (ITV Sunday Night Theatre) =

- ITV Sunday Night Theatre episode
- Episode no.: Series 5 Episode 13
- Directed by: Rex Firkin
- Written by: Vincent Tilsley
- Original air date: 7 January 1973

"The Death of Adolf Hitler" is a 1973 British television play, an episode of ITV Sunday Night Theatre. It stars Frank Finlay as Adolf Hitler and Caroline Mortimer as Eva Braun. First aired on 7 January 1973, the drama details the last 10 days of Hitler's life as World War II comes to an end and Allied troops close in on the Führerbunker. Michael Sheard (who played Himmler) and Tony Steedman (who played Gen. Jodl) would play the same roles in the American television film The Bunker in 1981. The play depicts Hitler as a tragic antihero tormented by both the past and present, unable to reconcile his hopes and dreams with the reality of the nightmare of his own making.

Finlay won a British Academy Television Award as Best Actor for his performance.
