= Vorbunker =

Adolf Hitler's air raid shelter

Coordinates: 52.5128°N 13.3818°E

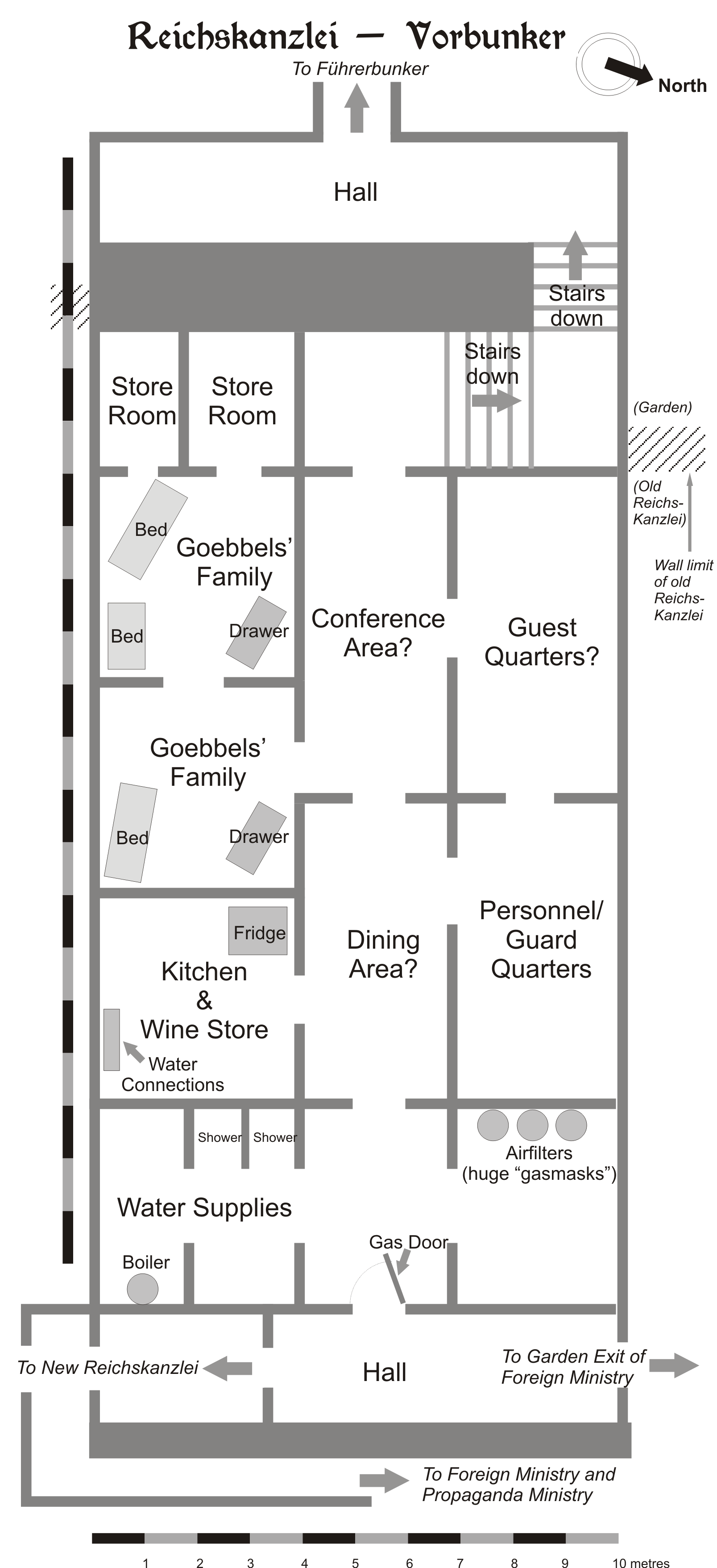
Schematic diagram of the Vorbunker as it was in April 1945

The Vorbunker (upper bunker or forward bunker) was an underground concrete structure originally intended to be a temporary air-raid shelter for Adolf Hitler and his guards and servants. It was located behind the large reception hall that was added onto the old Reich Chancellery, in Berlin, Germany, in 1936. The bunker was officially called the "Reich Chancellery Air-Raid Shelter" until 1943, when the complex was expanded with the addition of the Führerbunker, located one level below. On 16 January 1945, Hitler moved into the Führerbunker. He was joined by his senior staff, including Martin Bormann. Later, Eva Braun and Joseph Goebbels moved into the Führerbunker while Magda Goebbels and their six children took residence in the upper Vorbunker. The Goebbels family lived in the Vorbunker until their deaths on 1 May 1945.

== Construction ==
In 1933, Adolf Hitler decided to expand the Reich Chancellery (Reichskanzlei), which he considered too small for his needs. On 21 July 1935, Leonhard Gall submitted plans for a large reception hall (that could also be used as a ballroom) to be built onto the old Chancellery. The drawings were unique because of the large cellar that led a further one-and-a-half meters down to a bunker, which later became known as the Vorbunker.

The Vorbunker's roof was 1.6 meters (5.2 ft) thick, twice as thick as that of the bunker underneath the nearby Air Ministry building. The thick walls of the Vorbunker supported the weight of the reception hall overhead. It had three entry points, to the north, west, and south. Construction was completed in 1936. It had 12 rooms branching out from a single corridor.

The Führerbunker was built by the Hochtief company as part of an extensive program of subterranean construction in Berlin. It was finished by 1944 and was connected to the Vorbunker by a stairway set at right angles (not a spiral staircase). The two bunkers could be closed off from each other by a bulkhead and steel door. A permanent guard detail was posted by the steel door. The Führerbunker was located about 8.5 metres (28 ft) beneath the garden of the old Reich Chancellery, 120 meters (390 ft) north of the new Reich Chancellery building at Voßstraße 6. The Führerbunker was located 2.5 meters lower than the Vorbunker and to the west-southwest of it. The accommodations for Hitler were moved to the Führerbunker, and by February 1945 it had been decorated with high-quality furniture taken from the Chancellery, along with several framed oil paintings.

== Events ==
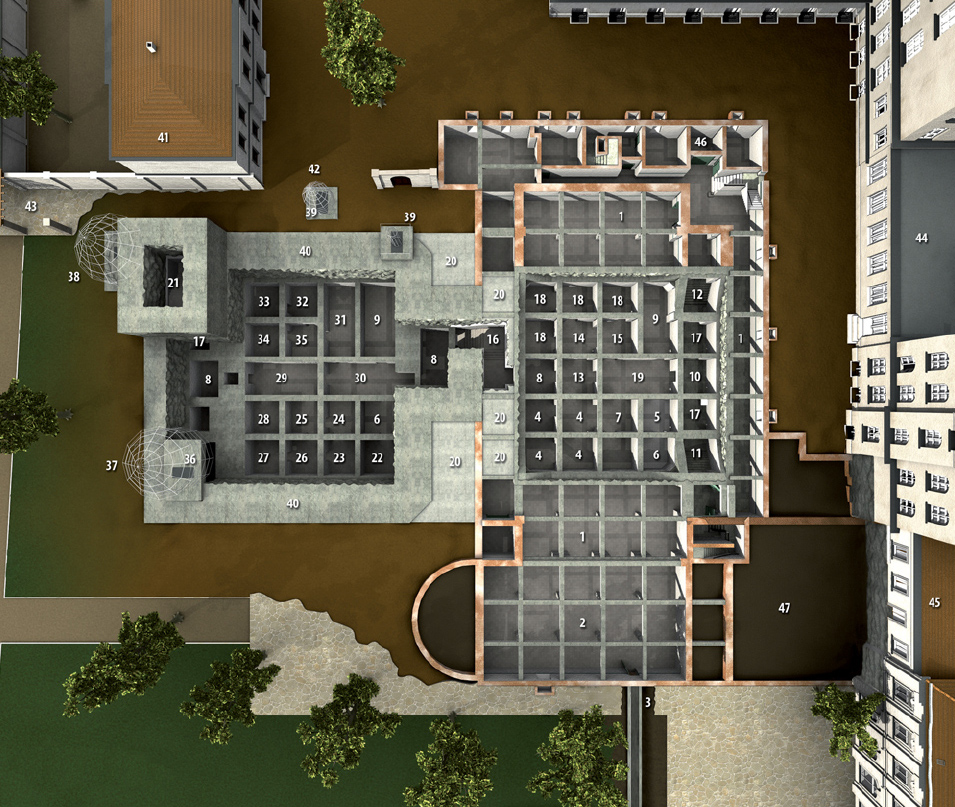
3D model of Führerbunker (left) and Vorbunker (right)

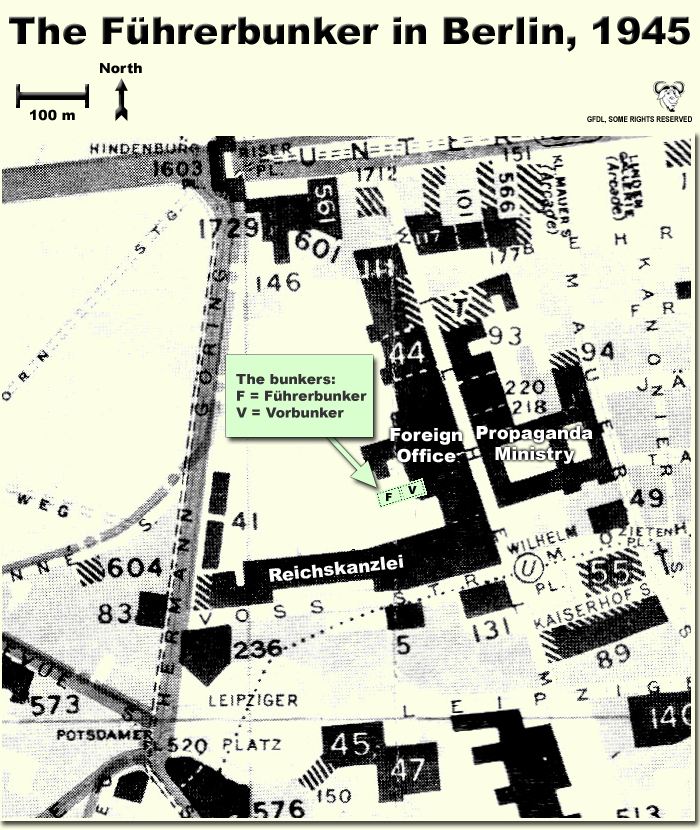
Map showing the locations of the Führerbunker and Vorbunker in Berlin, 1945

The first air-raid drills for the Berlin central government district, which included the Reich Chancellery, occurred in the autumn of 1937. The protocol for the drills stated, in part:

To carry out the air raid drills, a precise regulation is required for the three office buildings, Wilhelmstraße 77, Wilhelmstraße 78 and Voßstraße 1 ... The officials and residents of Wilhelmstraße 78 and Voßstraße 1 can go to the substitute shelters in Wilhelmstraße 78 and Voßstraße 1. The inhabitants of the Reich Chancellor House, Wilhelmstraße 77, will use the shelter under the ballroom.

The only residents of Wilhelmstraße 77 were Hitler and his bodyguards, adjutants, orderlies and servants. It is unknown if the Vorbunker was used before January 1945. Hitler transferred his headquarters to the Führerbunker in Berlin on 16 January 1945, where he (along with his influential private secretary, Reichsleiter Martin Bormann and others), remained until the end of April. After 16 January the Vorbunker was used by various military officers and housed men from Hitler's personal bodyguard. In April 1945, as the Battle in Berlin raged on, Joseph Goebbels showed his strong support for Hitler by moving his family into the Vorbunker. He occupied a room in the Führerbunker which had recently been vacated by Hitler's personal physician, Theodor Morell. Two rooms in the Vorbunker were used for food supply. Hitler's personal dietitian, Constanze Manziarly prepared meals in the kitchen, which was equipped with a refrigerator and a wine store.

On the evening of 1 May 1945, Goebbels arranged for an SS dentist, Helmut Kunz, to inject his six children with morphine so that when they were unconscious, an ampule of cyanide could be crushed in each of their mouths. According to Kunz's later testimony, he gave the children morphine injections but it was Magda Goebbels and SS-Obersturmbannführer Ludwig Stumpfegger, Hitler's personal doctor, who administered the cyanide.

Afterwards, Goebbels and his wife went up the stairs to ground level and through the Führerbunker emergency exit to the bombed-out garden behind the Reich Chancellery. There are several different accounts on what followed. According to one account, Goebbels shot his wife and then himself. Another account was that they each bit on a cyanide ampule and were given a coup de grâce immediately afterwards by Goebbels' SS adjutant, Günther Schwägermann. Schwägermann testified in 1948 that the couple walked ahead of him up the stairs and out into the Chancellery garden. He waited in the stairwell and heard the "shots" sound. Schwägermann then walked up the remaining stairs and outside. There he saw the lifeless bodies of the couple. Following Joseph Goebbels prior order, Schwägermann told an SS soldier to make sure Goebbels was dead. The soldier fired into Goebbels body, which did not move. The bodies were then doused with petrol, but the remains were only partially burned and not buried.

At 01:00 on 2 May, the Soviets picked up a radio message from the LVI Panzer Corps requesting a cease-fire and stating that emissaries would come under a white flag to Potsdamer bridge. Early in the morning of 2 May, the Soviets captured the Reich Chancellery. General of the Artillery Helmuth Weidling, the commander of the Berlin Defense Area, surrendered with his staff at 06:00. Down in the Führerbunker, Chief of the Army General Staff General Hans Krebs and Hitler's Chief Adjutant Generalleutnant Wilhelm Burgdorf committed suicide by gunshot to the head. Johannes Hentschel, the master electro-mechanic for the bunker complex, stayed after everyone else had either committed suicide or left, as the field hospital in the Reich Chancellery above needed power and water. He surrendered to the Red Army as they entered the bunker complex at 09:00 on 2 May. The bodies of Goebbels six children were discovered on 3 May. They were found in their beds in the Vorbunker; the clear mark of cyanide appeared on their faces.

== Post-war events ==
The ruins of both Chancellery buildings were levelled by the Soviets between 1945 and 1949 as part of an effort to destroy the landmarks of Nazi Germany. The bunker complex largely survived, although some areas were partially flooded. In December 1947 the Soviets tried to blow up the bunkers, but only the separation walls were damaged. In 1959 the East German government began a series of demolitions of the Chancellery, including the bunker complex. In 1974, 1.5 meters (4.9 ft) of water was pumped from inside the bunkers, and the East Germany Stasi conducted a survey of the interior of the Vorbunker and took external measurements of the Führerbunker. Since it was near the Berlin Wall, the site was undeveloped and neglected until after reunification.

During the construction of residential housing and other buildings on the site in 1988–89, several underground sections of the bunker complex were uncovered by work crews. In April 1988, the East German government allowed several visits to the site by photo-journalists. Water was pumped out of the Vorbunker for four days before access could be made via the underground passageway which led from the Chancellery. The interior floor of the Vorbunker was covered with a muddy sludge from having been underwater for so many years. Old empty wine bottles were found on the floor of the kitchen and wine store room. Still present in the room next to the kitchen were the broken frames of the bunk beds used by the Goebbels children. At the end of the hallway were the stairs leading down to the Führerbunker. However, the men could go no further than the mid-landing, as the Führerbunker was still underwater and the ceiling beyond the doorway had collapsed due to the demolitions performed in 1947. After these inspections, work crews for the most part removed and destroyed the bunker complex. The Vorbunker's top and external walls were the first structures to be torn down. The construction of buildings in the area around the complex was a strategy for ensuring the surroundings remained anonymous and unremarkable. The emergency exit point for the Führerbunker (which had been in the Chancellery gardens) was occupied by a car park.

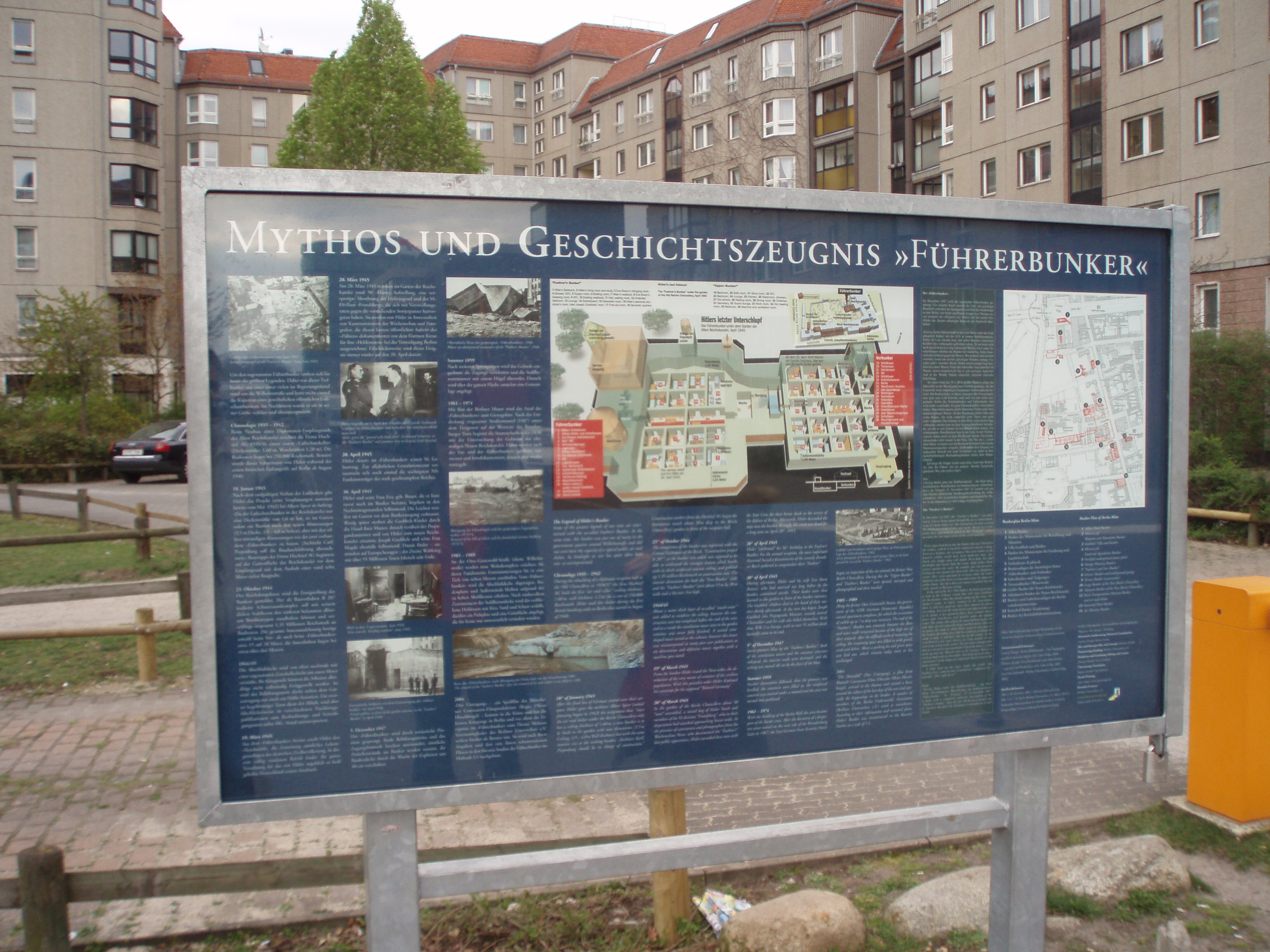
Site of the Bunker complex in 2007

On 8 June 2006, during the lead-up to the 2006 FIFA World Cup, an information board was installed to mark the location of the bunker complex. The board, including a schematic diagram of the bunker, can be found at the corner of In den Ministergärten and Gertrud-Kolmar-Straße, two small streets about three minutes' walk from Potsdamer Platz. Hitler's bodyguard, Rochus Misch, one of the last people living who was in the bunker at the time of Hitler's suicide, was on hand for the ceremony.

== See also ==
- Death of Adolf Hitler – 1945 suicide of German dictator
- Nazi architecture – Style promoted by the Nazis
- Welthauptstadt Germania – World capital city planned by Adolf Hitler
