= James P. O'Donnell =

American author and journalist (1917–1990)

- Born: James Preston O'Donnell; July 30, 1917
- Died: April 16, 1990 (aged 72)
- Occupations: Author, journalist
- Writing career
- Language: English
- Notable work: The Bunker

James Preston O'Donnell (July 30, 1917 – April 16, 1990) was an American author and journalist.

== Biography ==
O'Donnell was educated at Harvard College and worked as a journalist, mostly for magazines. He was a friend of the Kennedy family. During World War II he served in the U.S. Army Signal Corps until July 2, 1945, when he was discharged. He became Newsweek magazine's German bureau chief. In this capacity, he arrived in Berlin on July 4. He was assigned to investigate Hitler's death and to obtain information as to Eva Braun.

O'Donnell bribed the Soviet soldier guarding the entrance to Hitler's Berlin bunker becoming the first non-Soviet to examine it. He found and took numerous top secret Nazi documents. After using these documents and interviews with many of the last occupants of the Führerbunker in his later publications, he became an authority on the death of Adolf Hitler, and ultimately published his collected findings in his 1975 book, The Bunker.

After his tenure with Newsweek, O'Donnell worked for many years as a freelance journalist in Germany, and published pieces in magazines ranging from Life magazine to The Saturday Evening Post.

He later joined the U.S. State Department as an adviser on Berlin. He spent his last years as a journalism professor at Boston University. In 2011, historian Niall Ferguson credited O'Donnell as one of the few Western observers who accurately foresaw the fall of the Berlin Wall.

In the 1981 CBS television movie The Bunker, O'Donnell is portrayed by actor James Naughton in a brief scene at the beginning.

O'Donnell died due to lung and stomach cancer on April 16, 1990, at the Brigham and Women's Hospital in Boston.

== Books ==
- O'Donnell, James Preston (1971). Sailing to Byzantium: a study in the development of the later style and symbolism in the poetry of William Butler Yeats. New York: Octagon Books. ISBN 978-0-374-96141-1.
- O'Donnell, James Preston; Uwe Bahnsen (1975). Die Katakombe – Das Ende in der Reichskanzlei. Stuttgart: Deutsche Verlagsanstalt. ISBN 3-421-01712-3.
- O'Donnell, James Preston (1978). The Bunker: The History of the Reich Chancellery Group. Boston: Houghton Mifflin. ISBN 978-0-395-25719-7.

== Articles ==
- O'Donnell, James P. "I Cruised the Rhine on a Marshall-Plan Barge." The Saturday Evening Post, 3 September 1949.
- O'Donnell, James P. "The Ghost Train of Berlin." Das Beste, January 1979. (German)

== Other sources ==
- Ferguson, Niall. Civilization: The West and the Rest. New York: Penguin Books, 2011, ISBN 978-1-59420-305-3.
