= Walther Hewel =

German diplomat and member of Adolf Hitler's inner circle (1904–1945)

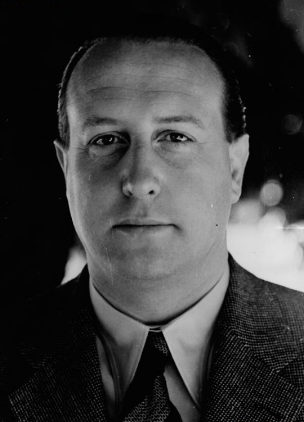
- Hewel in 1940

Permanent Representative of the Reichsminister for Foreign Affairs to the Führer
- In office September 1940 – 30 April 1945
- Minister: Joachim von Ribbentrop
- Preceded by: Position created
- Succeeded by: Position abolished

Head of the Personal Staff of the Reichsminister for Foreign Affairs
- In office June 1938 – 2 May 1945
- Minister: Joachim von Ribbentrop
- Preceded by: Position created
- Succeeded by: Position abolished

Personal details
- Born: 25 March 1904 Cologne, Rhine Province, Kingdom of Prussia, German Empire
- Died: 2 May 1945 (aged 41) Berlin, Nazi Germany
- Cause of death: Suicide
- Party: Nazi Party
- Profession: Diplomat
- Awards: Blood Order

Walther Hewel (25 March 1904 – 2 May 1945) was an early and active member of the Nazi Party who became a German diplomat, an SS-Brigadeführer and one of German dictator Adolf Hitler's personal friends. He served as the liaison officer between Reichsminister for Foreign Affairs Joachim von Ribbentrop and Hitler's headquarters. Present in the Führerbunker during the Battle of Berlin, he committed suicide while attempting to escape the Red Army after the breakout from the bunker.

== Early life ==
Hewel was born in 1904 to Anton and Elsa Hewel in Cologne in the Rhineland, where his father ran a cocoa factory. His father died in 1913, leaving Elsa to run the factory.

Hewel attended the Gymnasium in Cologne and passed his Abitur in 1923. He went on to attend the Technical University of Munich. That autumn, he joined the Stosstrupp Hitler, a formation of the Nazi Party's SA "brownshirt" stormtroopers – his member number was in the low 200s – and took part in Hitler's failed Beer Hall Putsch, carrying a swastika banner with 23-year-old Heinrich Himmler. As a participant in this event, he would later be awarded the Blood Order. After Hitler's subsequent conviction for treason, Hewel was in Landsberg prison with him for several months, where he served as Hitler's volunteer valet. He was released on 30 December 1924 because of his youth.

Hewel then served a commercial apprenticeship in Hamburg in 1926, following which he spent a year in England. From 1927, Hewel worked abroad for several years in the Dutch East Indies (now Indonesia) as a planter and coffee salesman for a British firm. Hewel joined the Nazi Party there in June 1933 and helped to organise local branches with German expatriates as members. By 1937, the Nazi Party in Indonesia had established branches in Batavia, Bandung, Semarang, Surabaya, Medan, Padang, and Makassar.

== In Nazi Germany ==
In 1936, Hewel returned to Germany, where he was appointed the chief of the East Asia Desk in the Foreign Section of the Party. He entered Germany's diplomatic service and was sent to Spain. Journalist James P. O'Donnell remarked that, during this time, Hewel "was almost certainly an agent of Admiral Wilhelm Canaris's Abwehr" counter-intelligence agency.

Hewel returned to Germany and, in August 1937, became the chief of the English Desk in the office of Ambassador Joachim von Ribbentrop. In February 1938, Ribbentrop became Reichsminister for Foreign Affairs and, in June, Hewel was named head of Ribbentrop's personal staff with the rank of Legation Councilor. On 15 March 1939, he transcribed the conference between Hitler and Czechoslovak President Emil Hácha.

Hewel joined the SS as an SS-Sturmbannführer on 12 July 1937, and attained the rank of SS-Brigadeführer on 9 November 1942.

=== During World War II ===
After the outbreak of the Second World War, Hitler was often at his field headquarters away from Berlin. In September 1940, Hewel was appointed the Permanent Representative of the Reichsminister for Foreign Affairs to the Führer, in effect, the liaison officer between Ribbentrop and Hitler's headquarters. During this time, he resumed his earlier friendship with the dictator. He spent most of World War II without an official portfolio and once described himself as "an ambassador to nowhere". In the later years of the war, as Hitler became more estranged from Ribbentrop, Hewel acted as Hitler's senior adviser on foreign policy matters and a member of Hitler's inner circle. On 31 March 1943, Hewel was raised to the rank of Ambassador for special assignments. When Hitler moved from his "Wolf's Lair" headquarters in East Prussia to the Führerbunker under the garden of the Reich Chancellery in Berlin, Hewel joined him there with the rest of Hitler's entourage.

Survivors of Hitler's inner circle claimed that Hewel owed his position to his long involvement with the Nazi Party, and because he was one of Hitler's friends. In her memoirs, Traudl Junge, Hitler's private secretary, described Hewel as something like Hitler's majordomo. According to Junge, Hewel was placed in charge of coordinating his household, keeping peace between the military and civilian officials around Hitler, and regulating contact between male and female members of Hitler's entourage.

Hewel – along with Propaganda Minister Joseph Goebbels; Hitler's personal secretary, Martin Bormann; Artur Axmann, the head of the Hitler Youth; Johann Rattenhuber, an SS General who was head of the Reichssicherheitsdienst (RSD), which protected Hitler; Ludwig Stumpfegger, Hitler's personal surgeon; and Otto Günsche, Hitler's personal adjutant – was one of the residents of the bunker to observe the burning of the bodies of Adolf Hitler and Eva Braun after they committed suicide. Along with all the others, he had been briefed by Hitler as to what to do to destroy the bodies, although this task was not properly carried out. Earlier, Hewel had been one of the attendees at the wedding between Hitler and Braun, and then the final goodbyes from Hitler and Braun before their suicides.

== Death ==
Until Hitler committed suicide on 30 April 1945, Hewel remained in his inner circle. As one of the few people to remain near him until the end, he was said to have tried to cheer Hitler up. He was among the last people to have a personal conversation with Hitler before he died, in which Hitler had encouraged Hewel to commit suicide. Hitler warned Hewel that if he was captured by the Red Army, he would be tortured and "mounted in a waxworks". Hitler gave Hewel a cyanide capsule and a Walther 7.65 handgun, then had him take an oath to kill himself rather than be captured by the Soviets.

Following Hitler's suicide, Hewel escaped the Führerbunker in a group led by SS-Brigadeführer Wilhelm Mohnke. Mohnke planned to break out towards the German Army, which was positioned in Prinzenallee. However, Hewel was suffering from psychological stress at the time. In her memoirs, Traudl Junge, one of Hitler's secretaries, claimed that, after Hitler's death, Hewel appeared extremely confused and unable to make the simplest decisions for himself.

The group headed along the U-Bahn tunnels, but their route was blocked so they went above ground and later joined hundreds of other German civilians and military personnel who had sought refuge at the Schultheiss-Patzenhofer Brewery. Upon arriving at the holdout on 2 May 1945, Hewel made remarks to the effect that he planned to commit suicide. Despite the efforts of Dr. Ernst-Günther Schenck, who attempted to talk him out of it in a long and wide-ranging conversation, Hewel killed himself in the manner that Professor Dr. Werner Haase had recommended to Hitler, biting down on a cyanide capsule while shooting himself in the head. According to Schenck, Hewel was emotionally and physically exhausted, which contributed to his actions.

In his long conversation with Schenck, Hewel said about Hitler, in response to Schenck's question about Hitler's mental health in his last days:

Hitler was a consummate actor.... Toward the end, he was less the leader, Der Führer, than a man flinging from reality as it advanced itself.... As I look back at those long briefing sessions, it strikes me that Hitler was hopelessly engulfed in the grandeur of his mission, a sense that was now disintegrating into self-pity. When the goddess Nemesis began to avenge his hubris, he lost his nerve.

== Personality and personal life ==
When Gretl Braun, the sister of Hitler's mistress Eva Braun, became pregnant out of wedlock, Hitler took steps to try to find her a husband. Hewel, a shy bachelor, was considered to be one of the possibilities. Braun later married SS-Gruppenführer Hermann Fegelein of the Waffen-SS. A few weeks later, on 12 July 1944, Fegelein's good friend, Elizabeth "Blondie" Blanda – a Red Cross nurse who had previously tended to Hewel after he survived an airplane crash on 21 April 1944 in which General Hans-Valentin Hube was killed – married Hewel at Berchtesgaden.

The tall and portly Hewel, whose nickname was "Surabaya Wally", is generally described as a pleasant and good-natured bon vivant, if not very intelligent. General Heinz Guderian recalled Hewel as "a good raconteur and a good listener". Members of Hitler's inner circle recounted that, unlike many other Nazi leaders, Hewel was able to stay awake and attentive during Hitler's long monologues on topics such as anti-Semitism. Martin Bormann, Hitler's private secretary, who actively worked to prevent his rivals from gaining access to the dictator, did not see Hewel as a threat, and encouraged their closeness, as Hewel was a calming influence. He usually ended up dealing with situations and events that Hitler could not handle. Hewel himself said that his role as the intermediary between Hitler and Ribbentrop called for "the tact of a mandarin and the footwork of an egg-dancer." When Ribbentrop called the Chancellery and asked to speak to Hewel, Hitler would often stand by him during the call and feed Hewel absurd things to tell the Foreign Minister, driving Ribbentrop into a tizzy.

A waiter in Berlin described Hewel after the war in this way:

He was the type of fellow who always knew how to get a good table by tipping the headwaiter in advance. I remember he would insist on artichoke hearts with his venison. He specialized in that kind of Gemütlichkeit [friendliness] that's never quite genuine unless it's a bit artificial.

O'Donnell referred to Hewel as a man who had a front row seat to history, but who lacked the intelligence and perspective to realize it.

== In popular culture ==
Walther Hewel has been portrayed by the following actors in film and television productions:

- John Savident in the 1973 British film Hitler: The Last Ten Days.
- Gerald Alexander Held in the 2004 German film Downfall (Der Untergang).
