= Peter Högl =

German SS officer (1897–1945)

- Born: 19 August 1897; Dingolfing, Bavaria, German Empire
- Died: 2 May 1945 (aged 47); Berlin, Nazi Germany
- Military career
- Allegiance: German Empire; Nazi Germany
- Branch: Bavarian Army; Schutzstaffel
- Service years: 1916–1919; 1934–1945
- Rank: Unteroffizier; Obersturmbannführer
- Unit: Reichssicherheitsdienst
- Commands: RSD Department 1
- Conflicts: World War I; World War II; Battle of Berlin (DOW)

Peter Högl (19 August 1897 – 2 May 1945) was a German officer holding the rank of SS-Obersturmbannführer (lieutenant colonel) who was a member of one of Adolf Hitler's bodyguard units. He spent time in the Führerbunker in Berlin at the end of World War II. Högl died from wounds received during the break-out on 2 May 1945 while crossing the Weidendammer Bridge under heavy fire in Berlin.

== Early life and career ==
Högl was born near Dingolfing in Bavaria. After he left school he worked as a miller in Landshut until he joined the 16th Bavarian Infantry Regiment in 1916, serving in World War I and reaching the rank of Unteroffizier. He left the army in 1919 and joined the Bavarian police, transferring to the criminal police in 1932. He rose to the position of Kriminalrat in the Kriminalpolizei.

== Nazi career ==
He joined the SS (member number: 249,998) and became a member of Adolf Hitler's bodyguard unit in 1933 and attained the rank of SS-Obersturmführer (first lieutenant) in 1934. From April 1935 he became the deputy to Johann Rattenhuber in the Reichssicherheitsdienst (Reich Security Service; RSD) and later was appointed Chief of RSD Department 1 (responsible for the personal protection of Hitler on a day-to-day basis during the war). In this capacity he was posted to the Obersalzberg, Munich and Berlin. From November 1944 forward, he was stationed in Berlin and held the title of Criminal Director. Beginning in January 1945, Högl spent time in the Führerbunker below the Reich Chancellery garden in central Berlin. In April 1945, it became a de facto Führer Headquarters during the Battle of Berlin, and ultimately, the last of Hitler's headquarters.

=== Capture of Hermann Fegelein ===
On 27 April 1945, Högl was sent out from the Chancellery to find Heinrich Himmler's liaison man in Berlin, SS-Gruppenführer and Generalleutnant of the Waffen-SS Hermann Fegelein, who had abandoned his post at the Führerbunker. Fegelein was caught by the RSD squad in his Berlin apartment, wearing civilian clothes and preparing to flee to Sweden or Switzerland. He was carrying German and foreign cash and jewellery, some of which belonged to Eva Braun. Fegelein was intoxicated when arrested by Högl and brought back to the Führerbunker where he was kept in a makeshift cell. The following evening, Hitler was informed of the BBC broadcast of a Reuters news report about Himmler's attempted negotiations with the Western Allies via Count Folke Bernadotte of Sweden. Hitler in a rage ordered Himmler's arrest. A military tribunal was ordered by Hitler to court-martial Fegelein. Waffen-SS General Wilhelm Mohnke presided over the tribunal, which included Generals Rattenhuber, Hans Krebs and Wilhelm Burgdorf. Although he was certain Fegelein was "guilty of flagrant desertion", Mohnke persuaded his fellow judges to close the proceedings and turned the defendant over to General Rattenhuber and his security squad. Mohnke never saw Fegelein again.

== Death ==
After Hitler's death on 30 April, Högl, Ewald Lindloff, Hans Reisser, and Heinz Linge carried his corpse up the stairs to ground level and through the bunker's emergency exit to the bombed-out garden behind the Reich Chancellery. There, Högl and the others witnessed the cremation of Hitler and Eva Braun. On the following night of 1 May, Högl joined Rattenhuber in his attempt to break-out from the Soviet Red Army encirclement. After midnight on 2 May 1945, he was wounded in the head while crossing the Weidendammer Bridge with Lindloff and Georg Betz. Högl, Lindloff and Betz all died from the injuries they sustained while crossing the bridge under heavy fire from Soviet tanks and guns. Högl was 47 years old.
