= Georg Betz =

German SS officer

- Born: 15 June 1903; Kolbermoor, Kingdom of Bavaria
- Died: 2 May 1945 (aged 41); Berlin, Nazi Germany
- Military career
- Allegiance: Nazi Germany
- Branch: Schutzstaffel
- Service years: 1932–1945
- Rank: SS-Obersturmbannfuhrer
- Unit: Fliegerstaffel des Führers
- Conflicts: World War II; Eastern Front; Eastern Allied invasion of Germany; Battle of Berlin (DOW)

Georg Betz (15 June 1903 – 2 May 1945) was a Schutzstaffel officer (SS number: 625,419), who rose to the rank of SS-Obersturmbannfuhrer during World War II. Betz served as Adolf Hitler's personal co-pilot and Hans Baur's substitute. Betz was present in the Führerbunker in Berlin in late April 1945. On 1 May 1945, Betz took part in the break-out from the Reich Chancellery in Berlin. On 2 May 1945, Betz was wounded while crossing the Weidendammer Bridge, which was under heavy fire from Soviet troops. He died from his wounds received.

== Biography ==
Betz was born in Kolbermoor near Rosenheim (Bavaria). He attended college for mechanical engineering in Munich. Betz then trained as a pilot. In 1932, he became a captain and flew European routes for Lufthansa. He joined the Schutzstaffel (SS) and was transferred to the staff of Reichsführer-SS Heinrich Himmler. Betz was appointed captain of the reserve aircraft of the Fliegerstaffel des Führers. Betz served as Hitler's personal co-pilot and Hans Baur's substitute. Betz was promoted to SS-Obersturmbannfuhrer on 30 January 1944. He further held the rank of Oberstleutnant der Reserve in the Luftwaffe.

=== Berlin ===
Betz was in Berlin during the month of April 1945. Betz had been placed in charge of a small fleet of aircraft at the Tempelhof Airport; making sure the planes were flight ready. Further, he was tasked with making a list of staff personnel to be flown out of Berlin to Obersalzberg, after Hitler gave the word to do so. On 20 April Hitler ordered Albert Bormann, Admiral Karl-Jesko von Puttkamer, Dr. Theodor Morell, Dr. Hugo Blaschke, secretaries Johanna Wolf, Christa Schroeder, and several others to leave Berlin by aircraft for the Obersalzberg. The group flew out of Berlin on different flights by aircraft of the Fliegerstaffel des Führers over the following three days. Thereafter, Betz was in charge of overseeing the construction of an emergency air strip near the Brandenburg Gate for use by the Führerbunker personnel.

On 29 April 1945, the Soviet Red Army launched an all-out attack on the centre of Berlin. The Soviet artillery opened up with intense fire in and around the Reich Chancellery area. That evening in the bunker complex below the Chancellery garden, Betz was present with Baur when Hitler said his farewell to his personal pilots. Baur pleaded with Hitler to leave Berlin. The men volunteered to fly Hitler out of Germany in a Ju 390 and to safety. It was all in vain as Hitler turned Baur down, stating he had to stay in Berlin. By the following day, 30 April, the Red Army was less than 500 metres from the Führerbunker. That afternoon, Betz was still present in the bunker complex during the time when Hitler committed suicide.

In one of Hitler's last orders, he had given permission for the Berlin forces to attempt a breakout of the Soviet encirclement after his death. General Helmuth Weidling, commander of the Berlin Defence Area, and SS-Brigadeführer Wilhelm Mohnke, the (Kommandant) Battle Commander for the centre government district, devised a plan to escape out from Berlin to the Allies on the western side of the Elbe or to the German Army to the North. Mohnke split up the Reich Chancellery and Führerbunker soldiers and personnel into ten main groups. Betz left the Reich Chancellery as part of one of the groups attempting to break out. After midnight on 2 May 1945, Betz was part of a large group of German soldiers and civilians who crossed the Weidendammer Bridge while under heavy fire from Soviet tanks and guns. Betz was wounded along with Ewald Lindloff and Peter Högl during the crossing. According to Erich Kempka, he came across the badly wounded Betz and left him in the care of Kaethe Hausermann, a dental assistant who had been on Hitler's staff working with Dr. Hugo Blaschke. Kempka went on to state that he learned that Betz died from his injuries a short time thereafter. Other sources only state that Betz died from his wounds received in the area of the Weidendammer bridge. Betz was 42 years old.

== See also ==
- Battle of Berlin
- Glossary of Nazi Germany
- List of Nazi Party leaders and officials
- List of SS personnel
