= Ewald Lindloff =

Waffen-SS officer during World War II (1908–1945)

- Born: 27 September 1908; Stuba, Germany (now Stobna, Poland)
- Died: 2 May 1945 (aged 36); Berlin, Germany
- Military career
- Allegiance: Nazi Germany
- Branch: (Schutzstaffel) Waffen-SS
- Service years: 1932–1945
- Rank: SS-Hauptsturmführer
- Units: 1st SS Division Leibstandarte SS Adolf Hitler, Führerbegleitkommando
- Conflicts: World War II

Ewald Lindloff (27 September 1908 – 2 May 1945) was a Waffen-SS officer during World War II, who was present in the Führerbunker on 30 April 1945, when Hitler committed suicide. He was placed in charge of disposing of Hitler's remains. Lindloff was later killed during the break-out on 2 May 1945 while crossing the Weidendammer Bridge under heavy fire in Berlin.

== Biography ==
Ewald Lindloff was born in Stuba near Danzig (now Stobna, Poland). Lindloff attended engineering college during the years 1928 to 1933. He joined the Schutzstaffel (SS) on 1 May 1932. On 15 July 1933, Lindloff was accepted into the Leibstandarte SS Adolf Hitler (LSSAH). He married Ilse Borchert, a secretary for Hitler's staff officers on 4 February 1938. He was promoted to the officer rank of SS-Untersturmführer on 30 January 1941. From 20 October 1942 until 10 May 1943, Lindloff was on active combat duty with the LSSAH. He was promoted to the rank of SS-Obersturmführer on 9 November 1941; and promoted to SS-Hauptsturmführer (captain) on 30 January 1945.

=== Berlin ===
By April 1945, he was a member of the Leibstandarte (LSSAH) Guard Battalion and Führerbegleitkommando (Führer Escort Command; FBK), which was assigned to guard Hitler in Berlin. Lindloff was present in the Führerbunker on the afternoon of 30 April 1945, when Hitler and Eva Braun committed suicide. Afterwards, Lindloff, Hans Reisser, Peter Högl and Heinz Linge carried Hitler's blanket-wrapped corpse up the stairs to ground level and through the bunker's emergency exit to the bombed-out garden behind the Reich Chancellery. The lifeless bodies of Hitler and Braun were doused with petrol. After the first attempts to ignite the petrol failed, Linge reentered the bunker and then returned with a thick roll of papers. Martin Bormann lit the papers and threw the torch onto the bodies. As the two corpses caught fire, a small group, including Otto Günsche, Bormann, Högl, Linge, Lindloff, Reisser, Erich Kempka and Joseph Goebbels raised their arms in Nazi salute as they stood just inside the bunker doorway.

After the salute, the men reentered the bunker complex. Approximately 30 minutes later, SS-Sturmbannführer Günsche ordered Lindloff to go and see how far the cremation had progressed and to bury the remains in the Chancellery garden; thus attempting to keep Hitler's remains from being captured by the Soviet Red Army. Lindloff went out and checked on the situation. He reported back to Günsche that the bodies were "already charred and torn open". The corpses "were in a horrible condition" in no small part due to the detonation of Soviet artillery and the shrapnel produced from the explosions. On and off during the afternoon the Soviets shelled the area in and around the Reich Chancellery. SS guards brought over additional cans of petrol to further burn the corpses. Just after 18:30 hours, Lindloff reported to Günsche that he had carried out his orders as to the disposal of the remains with the aid of fellow FBK member, SS-Obersturmführer Hans Reisser.

By 30 April 1945, the Soviet Army was less than 500 metres from the bunker complex. In one of Hitler's last orders, he had given permission for the Berlin forces to attempt a breakout of the Soviet encirclement after his death. General Helmuth Weidling, commander of the Berlin Defence Area, and SS-Brigadeführer Wilhelm Mohnke, the (Kommandant) Battle Commander for the centre government district, devised a plan to escape out from Berlin to the Allies on the western side of the Elbe or to the German Army to the North. Mohnke split up the Reich Chancellery and Führerbunker soldiers and personnel into ten main groups. Lindloff left the Reich Chancellery as part of one of the groups attempting to break out. After midnight on 2 May 1945, Lindloff was part of a large group of German soldiers and civilians who crossed the Weidendammer Bridge while under heavy fire from Soviet tanks and guns. Lindloff, Högl and Georg Betz were all three wounded during the crossing and died from the injuries they sustained. Lindloff was aged 36.

== See also ==
- List of Nazi Party leaders and officials
- Vorbunker
