= Johann Rattenhuber =

German SS general (1897–1957)

- Rattenhuber in Soviet custody
- Born: 30 April 1897; Munich, Kingdom of Bavaria, German Empire
- Died: 01 July 1957 (aged 60); Munich, Free State of Bavaria, West Germany
- Resting place: Munich Ostfriedhof
- Status: Deceased
- Conviction: War crimes
- Penalty: 25 years; repatriated to East Germany in 1955
- SS career
- Allegiance: Nazi Germany
- Branch: Schutzstaffel
- Rank: SS-Gruppenführer
- Commands: Reichssicherheitsdienst

Johann Rattenhuber (30 April 1897 – 30 June 1957), also known as Hans Rattenhuber, was a German police and SS general (Gruppenführer, i. e. Generalleutnant). Rattenhuber was the head of German dictator Adolf Hitler's personal Reichssicherheitsdienst (Reich Security Service; RSD) bodyguard from 1933 to 1945. In January 1942, Rattenhuber's RSD units participated in the mass shooting of 227 Jews at Strizhavka. After the war, he was released from a Soviet prison on 10 October 1955 and allowed to go to West Germany. He died in Munich in 1957.

== Biography ==
Rattenhuber was born in Munich, where he made a career as a police officer. During World War I he served in the 16th and 13th Bavarian Infantry Regiments. He later joined the Freikorps. On 15 March 1933 he was appointed head of one of Hitler's personal bodyguard units then known as the Führerschutzkommando (Führer protection command; FSK). His deputy was Peter Högl. Its original members were Bavarian criminal-police officers. They were charged with protecting the Führer only while he was inside the borders of Bavaria which was the area of their authority. In the spring of 1934, the Führerschutzkommando replaced the SS-Begleitkommando for Hitler's overall protection throughout Germany.

The FSK was officially renamed the Reichssicherheitsdienst (RSD) on 1 August 1935. Heinrich Himmler, head of the SS, gained full control over the RSD in October 1935. Although Himmler was officially named chief, Rattenhuber remained in command and took his orders for the most part from Hitler. Himmler was given administrative control over the unit. The RSD should not be confused with the Sicherheitsdienst or SD. The RSD was technically on the staff of Himmler with the members wearing the uniform of the SS with the SD diamond on their lower left sleeve.

On the outbreak of World War II, the RSD had 200 men in its ranks. Rattenhuber's unit provided personal security to members of the Nazi Party leadership and for top members of the Nazi government. As for the SS-Begleitkommando, it was expanded and became known as the Führerbegleitkommando (Führer Escort Command; FBK). The FBK continued under separate command until April 1945 and remained responsible for Hitler's close personal protection. The RSD and FBK worked together for security and personal protection during Hitler's trips and public events, but they operated as two groups and used separate vehicles. For those occasions, Rattenhuber would be in overall command and the FBK chief, at the time, would act as his deputy.

Rattenhuber was responsible for securing Hitler's field headquarters. This included the Wolf's Lair (Wolfsschanze), which Hitler first used on 23 June 1941. Rattenhuber travelled to Vinnytsia, Ukraine, as Hitler's Werwolf bunker was under construction to survey the area. In January 1942 he met with local SS-police leaders and civilian authorities, and ordered that the area be cleared of Jews prior to Hitler's planned arrival in summer 1942. On 10 January 1942, Rattenhuber's RSD units participated in the mass shooting of 227 Jews at Strizhavka, the actual grounds of the Werwolf site. Details of the execution were reported to Rattenhuber by his deputy, SS-Sturmbannführer Friedrich Schmidt. Additional massacres of local Jews in the area and POW laborers who worked on the construction of the Werwolf headquarters occurred on the eve of Hitler's arrival in July 1942.

=== Berlin, 1945 ===
In January 1945, Rattenhuber accompanied Hitler and his entourage into the bunker complex under the Reich Chancellery garden in the central government sector of Berlin. Rattenhuber was promoted in rank to SS-Gruppenführer on 24 February 1945. On 28 April, when it was discovered that Heinrich Himmler was trying to negotiate a backdoor surrender to the Western Allies via Count Folke Bernadotte, Rattenhuber became part of a military tribunal ordered by Hitler to court-martial Himmler's SS liaison officer Hermann Fegelein. Fegelein, by that time was Eva Braun's brother-in-law. Wilhelm Mohnke presided over the tribunal which, in addition to Rattenhuber and Mohnke, included Generals Hans Krebs and Wilhelm Burgdorf. However, Fegelein was so drunk that he was crying, vomiting and unable to stand up; he even urinated on the floor. It was the opinion of the judges that he was in no condition to stand trial. Therefore, Mohnke closed the proceedings and turned Fegelein over to the RSD security squad.

Rattenhuber was one of the group to whom Hitler announced that he intended to kill himself rather than be captured by the Soviet forces who were occupying Berlin. He later testified:

"About 10 o'clock at night [on 29 April] Hitler summoned me to his room... Hitler said: 'You have served me faithfully for many years. Tomorrow is your birthday and I want to congratulate you and thank you for your faithful service, because I shall not be able to do so tomorrow... I have taken the decision... I must leave this world...' I went over to Hitler and told him how necessary his survival was for Germany, that there was still a chance to try and escape from Berlin and save his life. 'What for?' Hitler argued. 'Everything is ruined..., and to flee means falling into the hands of the Russians'..."

Rattenhuber was not present when Hitler killed himself on the afternoon of 30 April in the Führerbunker. He did not see Hitler's body until after it was wrapped in grey blankets and carried out of the office/sitting room where Hitler died. He was not one of those who took the body up the stairs and outside. Instead, Rattenhuber followed Heinz Linge, Otto Günsche, Peter Högl, Ewald Lindloff and several others outside and watched Hitler's body being burned.

On 1 May, Rattenhuber led one of the ten groups escaping from the Reich Chancellery and Führerbunker. Two of the other main groups were led by SS-Brigadeführer Wilhelm Mohnke and Werner Naumann. Most, including Rattenhuber, were taken prisoner by the Soviets on the same day or the following day. Rattenhuber was taken to Moscow, where on 20 May he gave a description of the last days of Hitler and the Nazi leadership in the bunker complex. The text of this was kept in the Soviet archives until it was published by V. K. Vinogradov in the Russian edition of Hitler's Death: Russia's Last Great Secret from the Files of the KGB in 2000.

=== Post-war ===
In August 1951 he was charged by the Soviet Ministry of State Security that "from the early days of the Nazi dictatorship in Germany in 1933 and until the defeat of the latter in 1945, being an SS-Gruppenführer, Police Lieutenant-General and the chief of the Reich Security Service, he ensured the personal security of Hitler and other Reich leaders". Rattenhuber was sentenced by the Court Martial of the Moscow Military District on 15 February 1952 to 25 years' imprisonment. By a decree of the Presidium of the Supreme Soviet of September 1955 he was released from prison on 10 October 1955 and handed over to the German Democratic Republic authorities, who allowed him to go to West Germany in 1956. Rattenhuber died in Munich in 1957.
