= Otto Günsche =

Personal adjutant of Adolf Hitler (1917–2003)

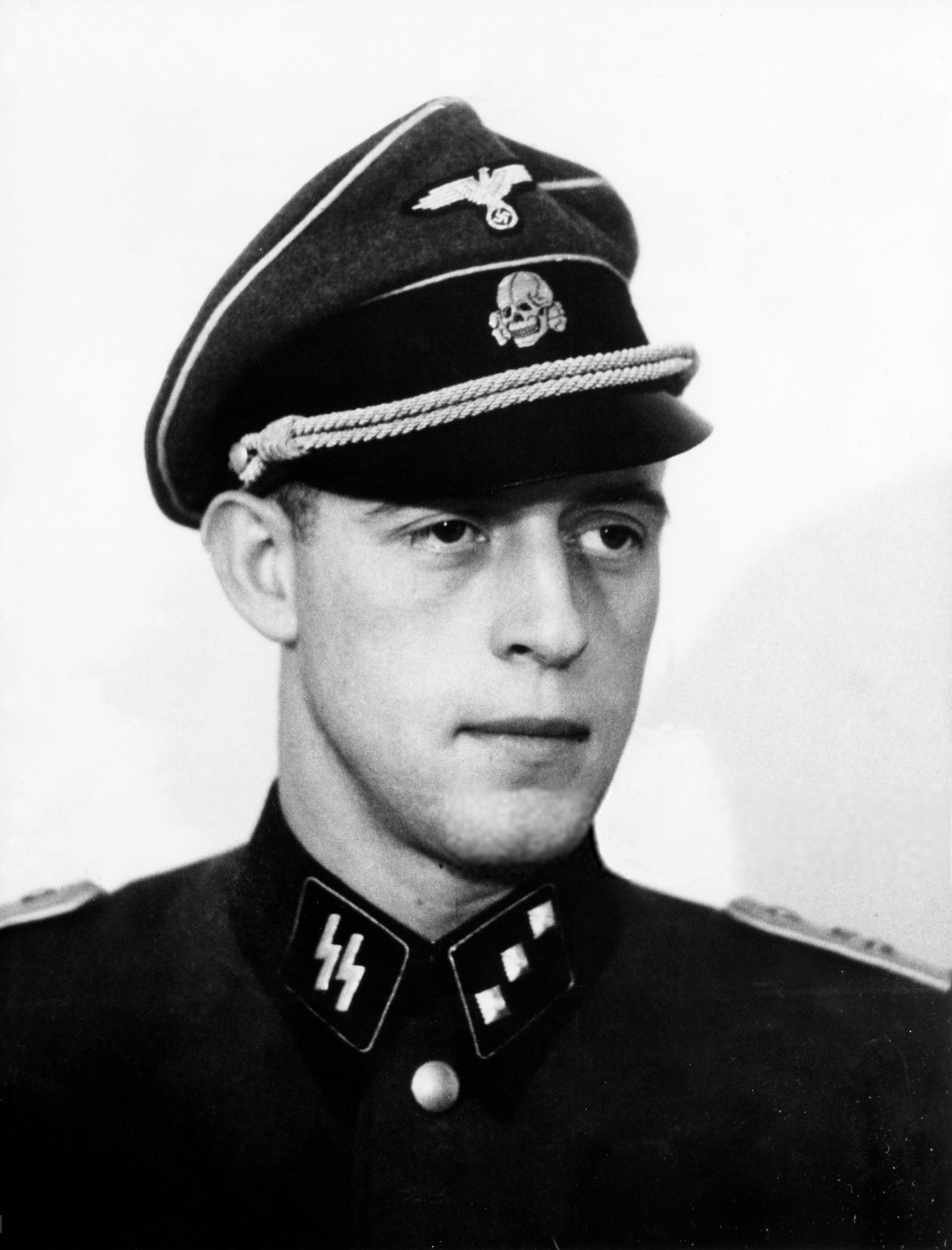
- Günsche in 1935
- Born: 24 September 1917; Jena, German Empire
- Died: 2 October 2003 (aged 86); Lohmar, Germany
- Burial place: North Sea (ashes scattered)
- Children: 3
- Military career
- Allegiance: Germany
- Branch: Waffen-SS
- Service years: 1933–1945
- Rank: SS-Sturmbannführer
- Units: 1st SS Panzer Division Leibstandarte SS Adolf Hitler (1934–1945); Führerbegleitkommando (1940–1941; 1943; 1944–1945)
- Known for: Being Adolf Hitler's personal adjutant and being present during Hitler's suicide on 30 April 1945
- Conflicts: World War II; Western Front; Occupation of France; Eastern Front; Invasion of the Soviet Union; Battle of Berlin (POW); 20 July plot

Otto Günsche (24 September 1917 – 2 October 2003) was a mid-ranking officer of the Waffen-SS during World War II. He was a member of the SS Division Leibstandarte before he became Adolf Hitler's personal adjutant. During the Battle of Berlin, Günsche was present in the Führerbunker during Hitler's suicide on 30 April 1945 and was captured by the Red Army as a prisoner of war two days later.

While in custody at various labour camps and prisons across the Soviet Union, Günsche was tortured and interrogated for information on the circumstances of Hitler's death and the purported possibility of his escape. Günsche was transferred to a prison in East Germany in 1955 and released on 2 May 1956. He was again questioned and brought to court by the Western Allies to provide sworn key testimony about Hitler's death.

== Life and career ==
Otto Günsche was born in Jena in Saxe-Weimar-Eisenach. After leaving secondary school at the age of 16, he volunteered for the Leibstandarte SS Adolf Hitler and joined the Nazi Party on 1 July 1934. He first met Adolf Hitler in 1936. He was Hitler's SS adjutant from 1940 to 1941. From 1 January 1941 to 30 April 1942, he attended the SS officers' academy. He then had front-line combat service as a Panzer Grenadier company commander with the LSSAH. On 12 January 1943, Günsche became a personal adjutant for Hitler. From August 1943 to 5 February 1944, Günsche served on the Eastern Front and in France. In March 1944 he was again appointed a personal adjutant for Hitler. As a personal SS adjutant (Persönlicher Adjutant) to Hitler, Günsche was also a member of the Führerbegleitkommando, which provided security for Hitler. During the war, one or two were always present with Hitler during the military situation conferences. He was present at the 20 July 1944 attempt to kill Hitler by use of a bomb at the Wolf's Lair in Rastenburg. The explosion burst Günsche's eardrums and caused him to receive a number of contusions.

With the collapse of Nazi Germany imminent, on 30 April 1945 Hitler tasked Günsche with ensuring the cremation of his body after his death. That afternoon, Günsche stood guard outside the room in the Führerbunker where Hitler and Eva Braun committed suicide. After waiting a short time, Hitler's valet, Heinz Linge, opened the study door with Martin Bormann at his side. The two men entered the study with Günsche right behind them. Günsche then left the study and announced that Hitler was dead to a group in the briefing room, which included Joseph Goebbels, General Hans Krebs, and General Wilhelm Burgdorf. Günsche had the table and chairs in the study moved out of the way and blankets were laid out on the floor. Hitler and Braun's lifeless bodies were then wrapped in blankets. In accordance with Hitler's prior written and verbal instructions, his and Braun's bodies were carried up the stairs and through the bunker's emergency exit to the garden behind the Reich Chancellery to be burned. Having ensured that the corpses were burnt using petrol supplied by Hitler's chauffeur Erich Kempka, Günsche left the Führerbunker after midnight on 1 May. The next day, he was taken prisoner by Soviet Red Army troops that were encircling the city and flown to Moscow for interrogation by the NKVD.

=== Post-war and death ===
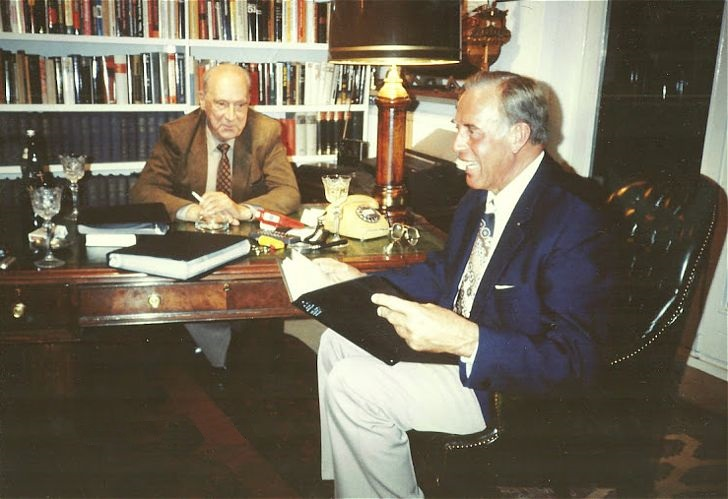
Günsche (right) with Wilhelm Mohnke, 1999

Before sentencing, Günsche was held in the NKVD special camp No. 48 for high-ranked POWs. He served most of his sentence in Sverdlovsk. As one of three witnesses to the immediate aftermath of Hitler's death, Günsche was torturously interrogated by the Soviets, who focused on Hitler's method of death and potential escape using a body double. A Soviet report dated 17 May 1945 alleges that Günsche said he only saw Hitler's body after it had been moved. He then told the Soviets on 18–19 May that he entered the room behind Linge, who told him that the cause of death was a gunshot. Although the two were kept in solitary confinement by the Soviets, they were brought together under supervision as primary sources for Operation Myth, the biography of Hitler prepared for Joseph Stalin. According to Soviet officers, Linge collaborated freely, while Günsche did not and reportedly even resorted to threats "to bring Linge round to his point of view". The dossier was edited by officers of the Soviet NKVD (later superseded by the MVD). The report was received by Stalin on 30 December 1949 (and published in 2005 as The Hitler Book). Günsche was transferred to Bautzen prison in East Germany in 1955 and released on 2 May 1956.

After his release, Günsche was questioned by the Western Allies as to Hitler's manner of death, which included sworn court testimony. Kempka, Hitler Youth leader Artur Axmann and Hitler's secretary Traudl Junge stated that Günsche initially told them that Hitler shot himself through the mouth, with Kempka saying Günsche made a hand gesture to indicate this. Günsche denied making such statements or a gesture suggesting Hitler's manner of death. In June 1956, Günsche testified that he saw the entry wound in Hitler's right temple (Note: Günsche separately recollected that "Hitler's face was covered with blood.") and a blood puddle on the rug, also noting the smell of cyanide from Braun's corpse. Contrarily to Linge and Axmann, Günsche stated that he saw Hitler's body in an armchair rather than the sofa. Citing the bloodstain on the sofa, historian Anton Joachimsthaler concluded in his 1995 book on Hitler's death that Günsche was mistaken about the location of Hitler's body. Günsche testified he checked both of Hitler's pistols' that were found laying on the carpet and noted that one bullet had been discharged from the 7.65 mm handgun. Joachimsthaler cited Günsche's statements and court testimony in his book and also interviewed him about Hitler's death. Joachimsthaler criticized Günsche and Linge for delegating the task of burning Hitler and Braun's bodies to SS officers Ewald Lindloff and Hans Reisser.

Günsche died of heart failure on 2 October 2003 at his home in Lohmar, North Rhine-Westphalia. He had three children. Günsche's body was cremated with his ashes scattered in the North Sea.

According to journalist Jean-Christophe Brisard and filmmaker Lana Parshina, as of 2017 the Soviet military file on Günsche, although declassified, remained closed to the public without the authorization of a family member.

== In popular culture ==
- Downfall (2004 film), in which he was portrayed by actor Götz Otto. Just like Otto, Günsche was about 2 metres tall.

== Awards and decorations ==
- Wound Badge in Silver
- Infantry Assault Badge
- Iron Cross 2nd Class
- Iron Cross 1st Class
