= Erich Kempka =

Chauffeur for Adolf Hitler (1910–1975)

- Born: 16 September 1910; Oberhausen, German Empire
- Died: 24 January 1975 (aged 64); Freiberg am Neckar, West Germany
- Military career
- Allegiance: Nazi Germany
- Branch: Schutzstaffel; Allgemeine SS
- Service years: 1932–1945
- Rank: SS-Obersturmbannführer
- Service number: 2,803
- Unit: Führerbegleitkommando

Erich Kempka (16 September 1910 – 24 January 1975) was a member of the SS in Nazi Germany who served as Adolf Hitler's primary chauffeur from 1936 to April 1945. He was present in the area of the Reich Chancellery on 30 April 1945, when Hitler shot himself in the Führerbunker. Kempka delivered petrol to the garden behind the Chancellery, where the remains of Hitler and Eva Braun were burned. After Kempka's capture by United States forces, he served as a witness as to Hitler's demise, while admitting to his unreliability.

== Early life ==
Kempka was born on 16 September 1910 in Oberhausen to a coal miner with ten children. He worked as a mechanic for the automotive manufacturer DKW.

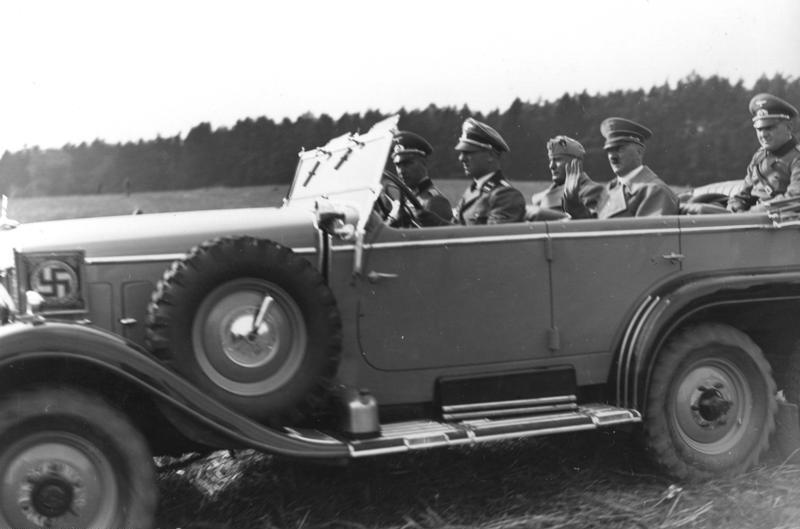
Kempka driving Hitler and Benito Mussolini in September 1937

== SS career ==
Kempka joined the Nazi Party on 1 April 1930 as member #225,639. Kempka served as chauffeur for Josef Terboven until 29 February 1932, when, based on Terboven's recommendation, he was tasked as a reserve driver for Adolf Hitler's personal entourage.

He became one of the original members of an eight-man squad known as the SS-Begleitkommando des Führers (SS Escort Command of the Führer), which later was known as the Führerbegleitkommando (FBK). The unit was assigned with protecting the life of Hitler. In 1934, he was present at the arrest of Ernst Röhm. In 1936, with the death of Julius Schreck, Kempka became Hitler's primary chauffeur. He was also appointed by Hitler as Chef des Kraftfahrwesens beim Führer und Reichskanzler (Chief of the Führer's and Reich Chancellor's Fleet of Cars).

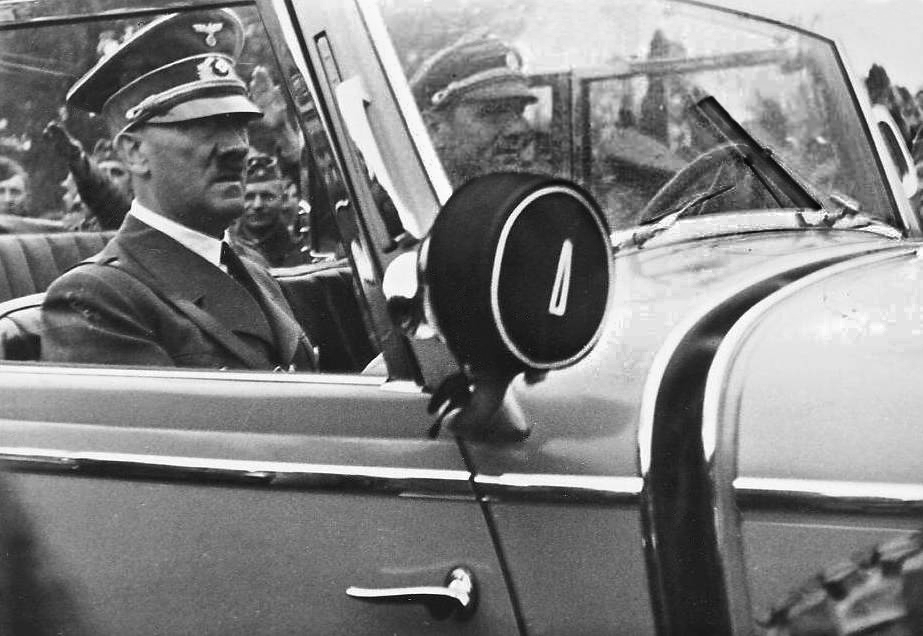
Hitler and Kempka in a Mercedes W31 – September 1939, Poland

As his chauffeur, Kempka usually drove one of Hitler's black Mercedes cars from a fleet of six to eight that were stationed in Berlin, Munich, and other places. Unless in the company of an important person, Hitler would sit in the front, next to Kempka, with a valet behind him. When travelling in motorcades, Hitler's car would be followed by two cars to the left and right, one with FBK men and the other with a detachment of Reichssicherheitsdienst (Reich Security Service; RSD) men. Further behind would be a car with his adjutants and physician, and more cars for press agency representatives, stenographers, and provisions. Later in July 1938, upon Kempka's directive a fully armor-plated Mercedes was built and delivered in time for Hitler's 50th birthday of 20 April 1939. The car had 18 mm steel plate and 40 mm bullet-proof glass.

On 1 December 1937, Kempka joined the Lebensborn society. He was awarded a Totenkopfring and the SS Honor Sword from Heinrich Himmler. At one time, Kempka had been engaged to Gerda Daranowski, a private secretary of Hitler's. She later married Luftwaffe officer Eckhard Christian on 2 February 1943.

=== Berlin (1945) ===
In 1945, as the end of Nazi Germany drew near, Kempka accompanied Hitler to the Reich Chancellery and later the Führerbunker. By then, Kempka oversaw a fleet of 40 vehicles, 60 drivers and mechanics. On 20 April, ten days before Hitler's suicide, he briefly wished the dictator a happy birthday and spent about fifteen minutes with him.

Kempka was one of those responsible for the burning of Hitler and Eva Braun's corpses after they committed suicide together on the afternoon of 30 April 1945. Around that time, Otto Günsche telephoned Kempka and told him to obtain as much petrol as he could and bring it to the emergency exit of the Führerbunker. (Note: As Kempka had no full cans stored in the Chancellery garage and a supply pipe from Berlin's fuel-rich Zoo Tower bunker had been cut off by Soviet bombardment, he suggested making a run that evening. Günsche said it could not wait and instead had Kempka collect fuel from damaged vehicles in the garage.) Kempka and his men produced eight to ten army petrol cans containing an estimated 180 to 200 litres (about 50 U.S. gallons) of petrol. The lifeless bodies of Hitler and Braun were carried up the stairs and through the bunker's emergency exit to the Reich Chancellery garden, where they were burned. Later, SS guards brought over additional cans of petrol to further burn the corpses.

Kempka left the bunker complex on the following night of 1 May along with SS-Hauptscharführer Heinrich Doose, a driver who was part of his staff. His group went down through the underground railway tunnels and made it to Friedrichstrasse station. At around 2:00 am, another group approached, which included Martin Bormann and Ludwig Stumpfegger. The group followed a Tiger II tank which spearheaded the first attempt to storm across the Weidendammer Bridge, but it was destroyed. Bormann and Stumpfegger were "tossed into the air" when the tank was hit. Kempka was knocked down and knocked out. After he came to, Kempka came across the badly wounded SS-Obersturmbannführer Georg Betz (Note: According to The Last Days Of Adolf Hitler Betz was last observed in the area of the Weidendammer Bridge as part of a group which left the Führerbunker during the evening of 1 May 1945. Other sources state that Betz died from wounds received during the crossing of the Weidendammer bridge.) (Hitler's personal co-pilot and Hans Baur's substitute) and left him in the care of Kaethe Hausermann, a dental surgeon who had been on Hitler's staff working with Dr. Hugo Blaschke. Kempka went on to state that he learned that Betz died from his injuries a short time later.

Kempka and several others followed the rail tracks hoping to reach the Lehrter station. They came across some foreign workers hiding out in a shed where the Germans got rid of their uniforms and changed into civilian clothes. A group of Soviet soldiers discovered them. A Yugoslav girl who had given him civilian clothes told the Soviet soldiers that Kempka was her husband. The soldiers insisted the group join them and drink vodka in celebration of victory. Later the Soviet troops left the area. The Yugoslav girl led him through the Soviet checkpoints and on 30 May, Kempka made it to Wittenberg. In Munich, he obtained some new identification papers from a German girl who was employed by the Allies as an interpreter. He continued on from there to Berchtesgaden. On 20 June, Kempka was captured by U.S. troops at Berchtesgaden and held until 9 October 1947. He was the first witness the Americans captured who could confirm the death of Hitler.

=== Role as an eyewitness ===
Kempka made numerous false or inconsistent statements during his interrogation. He initially claimed that he was present in the Führerbunker and saw Ludwig Stumpfegger examine Hitler's body. (Note: According to Heinz Linge, no doctors were called to inspect the corpses.) Kempka later admitted that he was not nearby until he arrived with petrol to burn Hitler and Braun's bodies, at which point Hitler's corpse had already been moved. Inside the bunker, Kempka found Martin Bormann carrying Braun's body, according to Kempka "like a sack of potatoes". Kempka took the body and brought it halfway up the exit stairs. He then handed the body to Günsche, who carried it outside and placed it on the ground of the garden next to Hitler's corpse.

Additionally, Kempka claimed that Günsche told him that Hitler had shot himself through the mouth, (Note: This claim was repeated by several early historians who covered the topic.) which Günsche later denied. Kempka correctly contended that Hitler's dental remains would be found separate from his body, attributing this to the intense burning and Soviet bombardment. (Note: Two other eyewitnesses claimed the gunshot would have dismantled Hitler's oral structure, but differed on whether the shot was to the mouth or temple.) Despite Hitler's legs allegedly burning away, Kempka bolstered the erroneous identification of a darned sock–wearing body double as Hitler by claiming that he had mended Hitler's socks a couple of nights before the dictator's death.

In 1974, Kempka said to interviewer James P. O'Donnell that after his capture in 1945, he told interrogators whatever they wanted to hear to save himself. Despite his questionable reliability on certain points, many interviewers quote Kempka in their accounts of Hitler's suicide. O'Donnell recounts some of Kempka's colorful recollections in The Bunker:

- He referred to SS General Hermann Fegelein as having "his brains in his scrotum". (Fegelein was executed by Hitler for trying to desert Berlin with his mistress.)
- He remarked that when Magda Goebbels was around Hitler, you could "hear her ovaries rattling". (Magda Goebbels was said to be quite attached to Hitler psychologically.)

== Post-war period ==
Kempka was released from captivity on 9 October 1947. He died on 24 January 1975, aged 64, in Freiberg am Neckar.

His memoirs first appeared in 1951 under the title Ich habe Adolf Hitler verbrannt (I cremated Adolf Hitler). In 1975, it was reissued with a foreword by author and former member of the Leibstandarte SS Adolf Hitler Erich Kern under the title Die letzten Tage mit Adolf Hitler (The Last Days with Adolf Hitler). An English edition of the book was published in 2010 by Frontline Books-Skyhorse Publishing, Inc., under the title I was Hitler's Chauffeur: The Memoirs of Erich Kempka, with an introduction by historian Roger Moorhouse.

At the 2008 military trial for Osama bin-Laden's driver, Salim Hamdan, the defense argued for his innocence, noting that Kempka was not tried as a war criminal for being a chauffeur for Hitler.

== See also ==
- Glossary of Nazi Germany
- List of Nazi Party leaders and officials
- List of SS personnel
- Downfall, 2004 film where he was portrayed by actor Jürgen Tonkel
