= Artur Axmann =

German Nazi official (1913–1996)

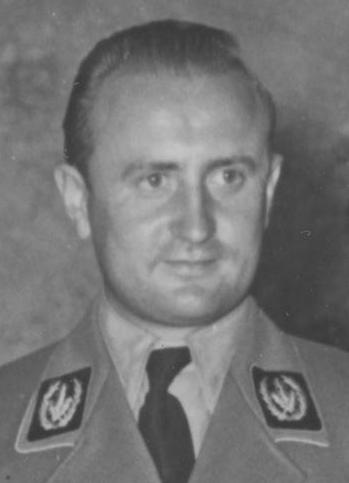
- Axmann in September 1942

Reich Youth Leader of the Nazi Party
- In office 8 August 1940 – 8 May 1945
- Appointed by: Adolf Hitler
- Preceded by: Baldur von Schirach
- Succeeded by: Office abolished

Personal details
- Born: 18 February 1913 Hagen, Province of Westphalia, Kingdom of Prussia, German Empire
- Died: 24 October 1996 (aged 83) Berlin, Germany
- Party: Nazi Party (1928–1945)

Military service
- Allegiance: Nazi Germany
- Branch/service: Army; Volkssturm
- Years of service: 1940–1941; 1945
- Unit: 23rd Infantry Division
- Battles/wars: Battle of France; Operation Barbarossa; Battle in Berlin

Artur Axmann (18 February 1913 – 24 October 1996) was the German national leader (Reichsjugendführer) of the Hitler Youth (Hitlerjugend) from 1940 to 1945, when the war ended. He was the last living Nazi with a rank equivalent to Reichsleiter.

== Early life and career ==
Axmann was born in Hagen, Westphalia, the son of an insurance clerk. In 1916, his family moved to Berlin-Wedding, where his father died two years later. The young Axmann was a good student and received a scholarship to attend secondary school. He joined the Hitler Youth in November 1928 after he had heard Nazi Gauleiter Joseph Goebbels speak.

Axmann became leader of the local cell in the Wedding district.

== Nazi career ==
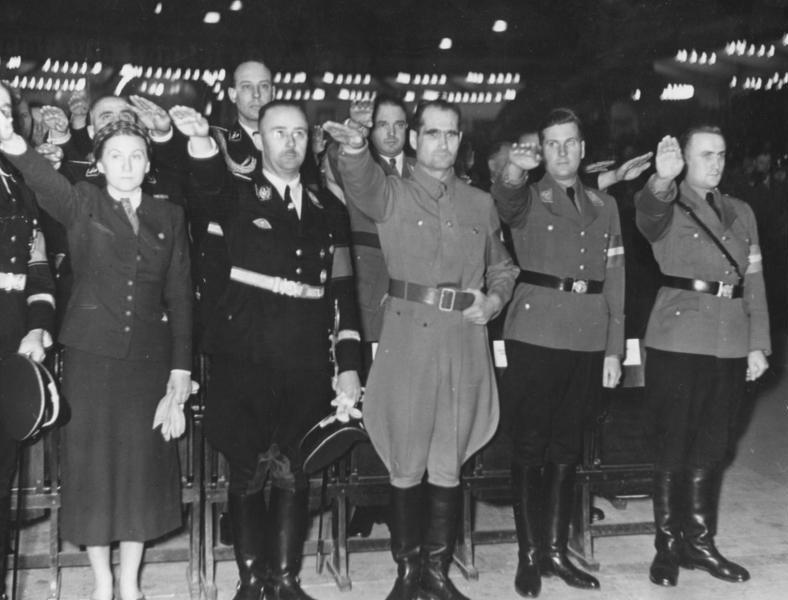
From left to right: Gertrud Scholtz-Klink, Himmler, Hess, von Schirach and Axmann, at a Hitler Youth rally, Berlin Sportpalast, 13 February 1939

In September 1931, Axmann joined the Nazi Party and the next year he was called to the NSDAP Reichsjugendführung to carry out a reorganisation of Hitler Youth factory and vocational school cells. After the Nazi seizure of power in 1933, he rose to a regional leader and became Chief of the Social Office of the Reich Youth Leadership.

Axmann directed the Hitler Youth in state vocational training and succeeded in raising the status of Hitler Youth agricultural work. He was also a member of Hans Frank's Academy for German Law and the chairman of its Committee on Youth Law. In November 1934, he was appointed Hitler Youth leader of Berlin and from 1936, presided at the annual Reichsberufswettkampf competitions. On 30 January 1939 he was awarded the Golden Party Badge. On 1 May 1940, he was appointed deputy to Nazi Reichsjugendführer Baldur von Schirach, whom he succeeded three months later on 8 August 1940. In October 1941, Axmann became a member of the Reichstag from electoral constituency 1, East Prussia.

After World War II began in Europe, Axmann was on active service on the Western Front until May 1940. As a member of the Wehrmacht 23rd Infantry Division, he was severely wounded on the Eastern Front in 1941 and lost his right arm.

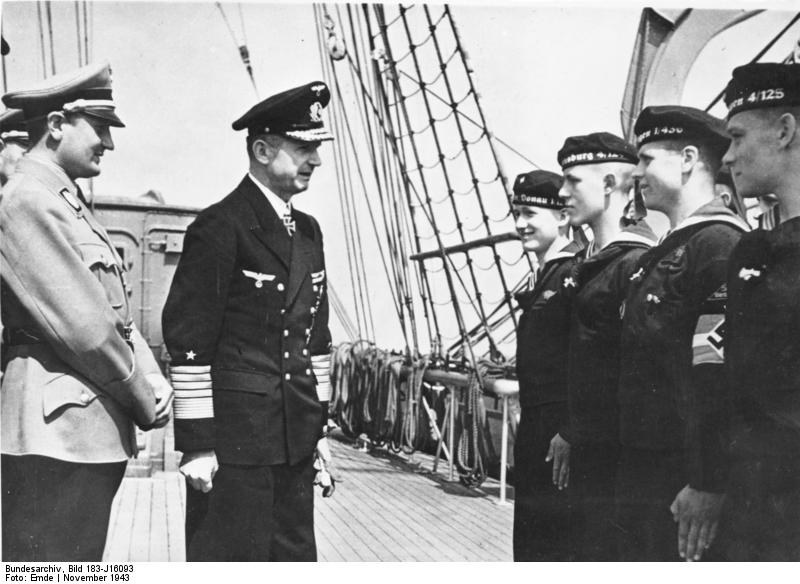
Arthur Axmann and Grand Admiral Karl Dönitz with sailors of the Horst Wessel, October 1943

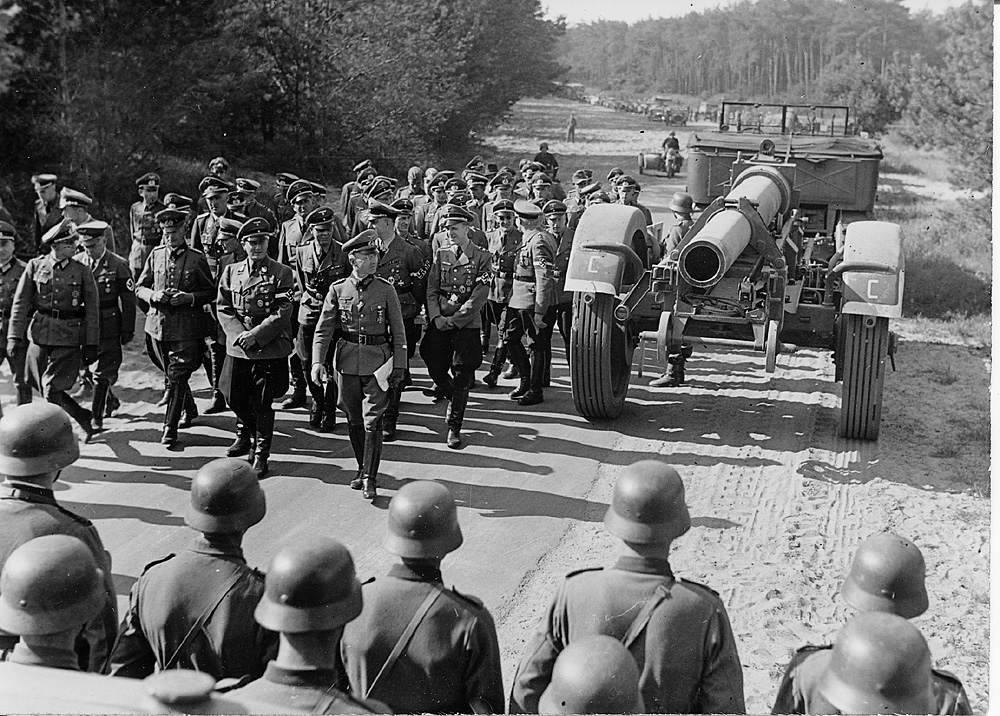
The Reich Youth Leader at the artillery school in Jüterbog where he inspected heavy artillery, 23 July 1943

In early 1943, Axmann proposed the formation of the 12th SS Panzer Division Hitlerjugend to Heinrich Himmler, with servicemen drawn from the Hitler Youth. Hitler approved the plan for the combat division to be made up of Hitler Youth members born in 1926 (members aged between 16–17), and recruitment and training began. In the last weeks of the war in Europe, Axmann commanded units of the Hitler Youth, which had been incorporated into the Home Guard (Volkssturm). His units consisted mostly of children and adolescents and fought in the Battle of Seelow Heights and the Battle in Berlin.

=== Berlin, 1945 ===
During Hitler's last days in Berlin, Axmann was among those present in the Führerbunker. Meanwhile, it was announced in the German press that Axmann had been awarded the German Order, the highest decoration that the Nazi Party could bestow on an individual for his services to the Reich. He and one other recipient, Konstantin Hierl, were the only holders of the award to survive the war and its consequences. All other recipients were either awarded it posthumously or were killed during the war or its aftermath.

On 30 April 1945, just a few hours before committing suicide, Hitler signed the order to allow a breakout. According to a report made to his Soviet captors by Gruppenführer Hans Rattenhuber, the head of Hitler's RSD bodyguard, Axmann took the Walther PP pistol that had been removed from Hitler's sitting room in the Führerbunker by Heinz Linge, Hitler's valet, which Hitler had used to commit suicide and said that he would "hide it for better times".

On 1 May, Axmann left the Führerbunker as part of a breakout group, which included Martin Bormann, Werner Naumann and SS doctor Ludwig Stumpfegger. The group managed to cross the River Spree at the Weidendammer Bridge.

Leaving the rest of their group, Bormann, Stumpfegger, and Axmann walked along railway tracks to Lehrter railway station. Bormann and Stumpfegger followed the railway tracks towards Stettiner station. Axmann decided to go in the opposite direction of his two companions. When he encountered a Red Army patrol, Axmann doubled back. He saw two bodies, which he later identified as Bormann and Stumpfegger, on the Invalidenstraße bridge near the railway switching yard (Lehrter Bahnhof), the moonlight clearly illuminating their faces. He did not have time to check the bodies thoroughly and so he did not know how they died. His statements were confirmed by the discovery of Bormann's and Stumpfegger's remains in 1972.

== Post-war ==
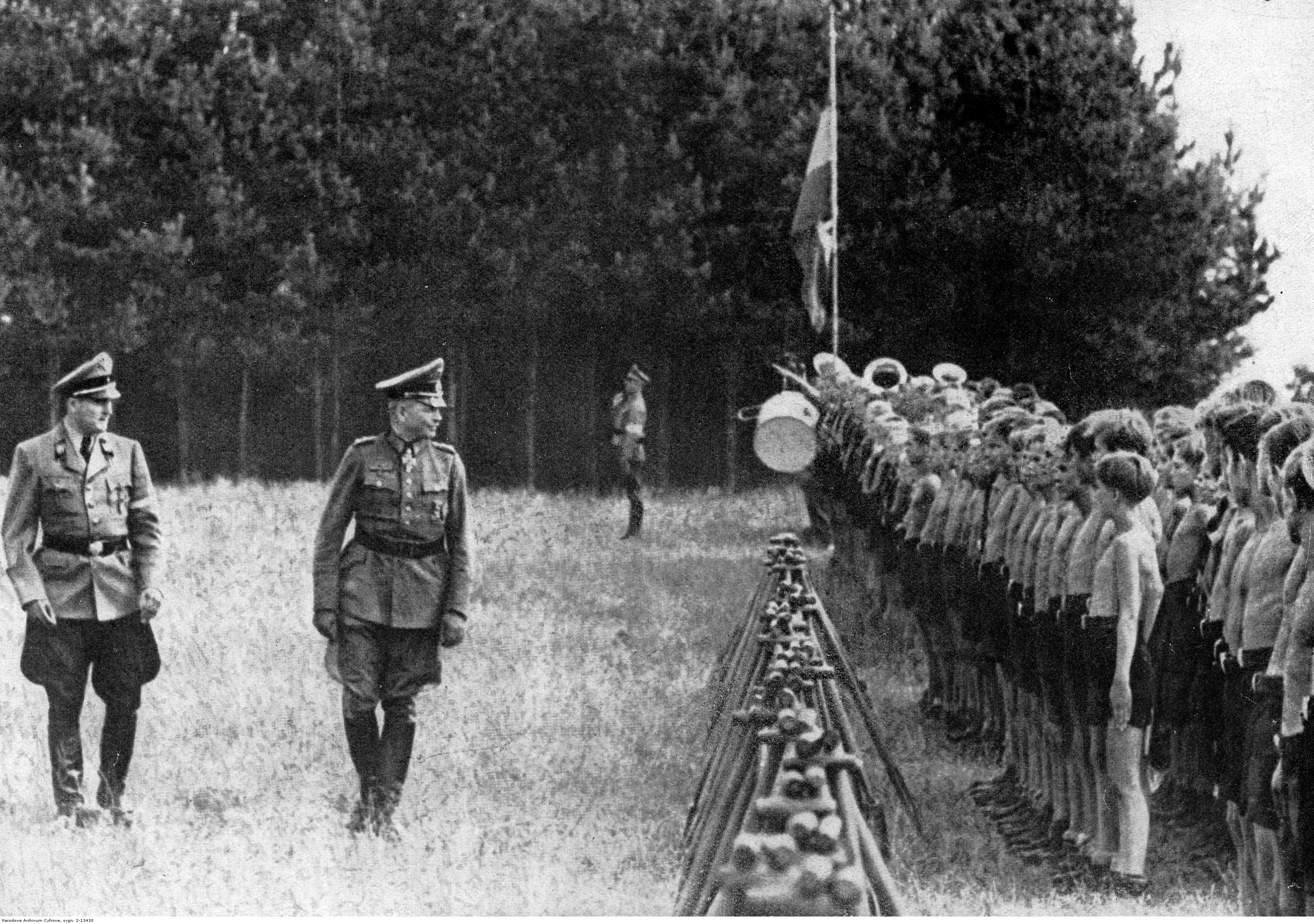
Arthur Axmann and General Heinz Guderian inspect Hitler Youth in East Prussia, September 1944

Axmann avoided capture by Soviet troops and lived under the alias of "Erich Siewert" for several months. In December 1945, Axmann was arrested in Lübeck when a Nazi underground movement, which he had been organising, was uncovered by a United States Army counterintelligence operation.

In May 1949, a Nuremberg denazification court sentenced Axmann to a prison sentence of three years and three months as a "major offender". He was not found guilty of war crimes.

On 19 August 1958, a West Berlin court fined the former Hitler Youth leader 35,000 marks (approximately £3,000 or US$8,300, equivalent to €87,937 in 2021), about half the value of his property in Berlin. The court found him guilty of indoctrinating German youth with National Socialism until the end of the war in Europe but concluded that he was not guilty of war crimes.

After his release from custody, Axmann worked as a businessman with varying success. From 1971 he left Germany for a number of years and lived on the Spanish island of Gran Canaria. Axmann returned to Berlin in 1976, where he died on 24 October 1996, aged 83. His cause of death and details of his surviving family members were not disclosed.

=== Role in identification of Hitler's remains ===
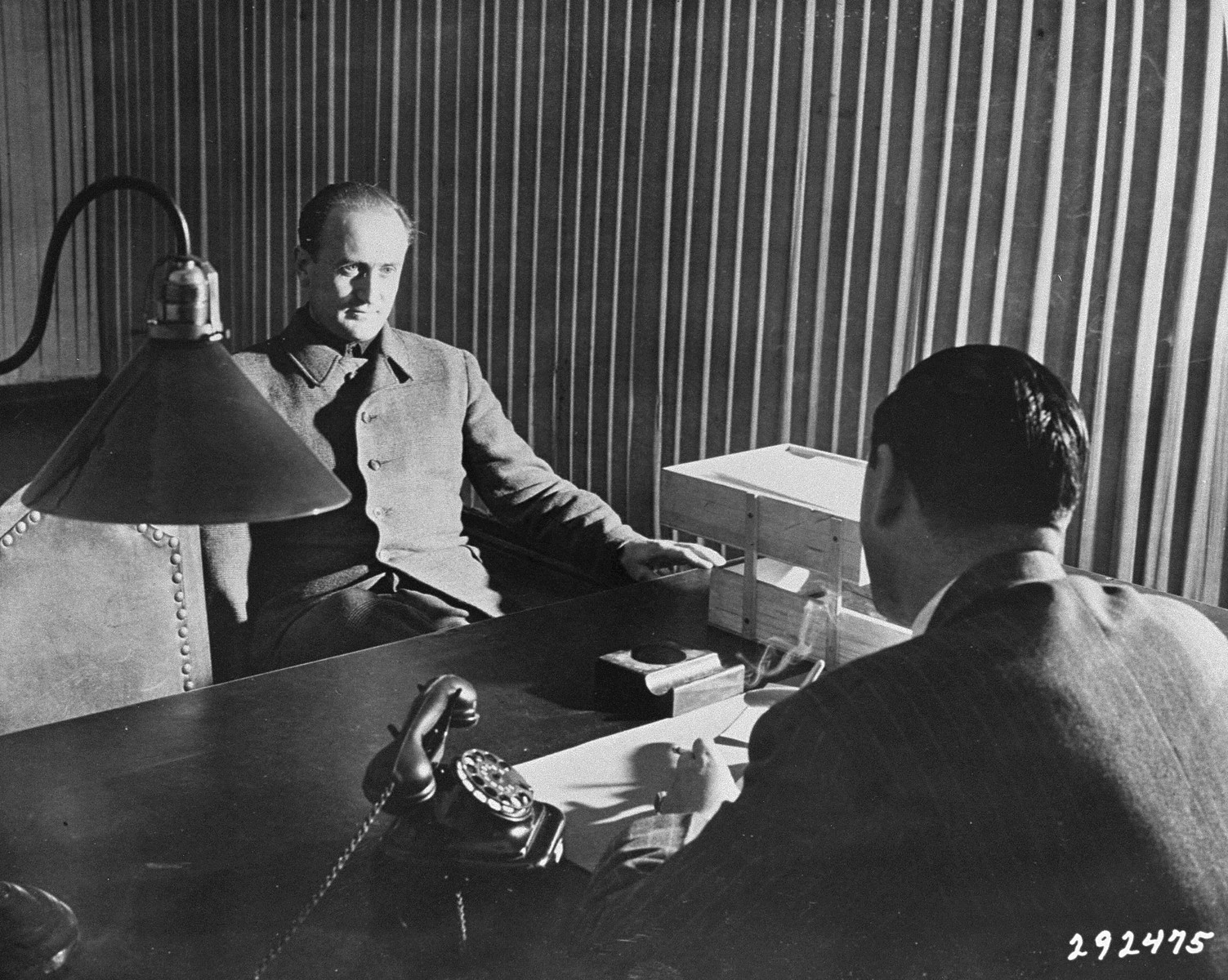
Axmann being interrogated about Hitler's death at Nuremberg, late 1947

Axmann uniquely saw blood dripping from both of Hitler's temples; he told US officials that he thought this was secondary damage from a gunshot through the mouth–which he thought was "obvious" due to the jawbone hanging askew, appearing "distorted", and contradicting himself about whether the mouth was bloody. He was one of three eyewitnesses who implied that the dental remains would only be found sundered, arguing that the gunshot would have caused this. In 1947, Axmann asserted that Hitler's corpse was not identified because the gunshot destroyed his dental work. SS-Rottenführer Harry Mengershausen similarly claimed that Hitler's jawbones would have been broken due to the gunshot's effect on air pressure.

For the first two decades after the war, Western historians generally regarded Hitler's mandible as being wholly recovered by the Soviets, as opposed to only a fragment with teeth. These dental remains were novelly detailed in a 1968 Soviet book which in turn supported the Western conclusion that only Hitler's dental remains were found intact.

Axmann stood by his oral-gunshot interpretation in his 1955 testimony, but court experts pointed out that the relevant caliber, 7.65 mm, travels under the velocity able to produce the hydrodynamic expulsion responsible for secondary damage. The two other key witnesses to survive the war were Linge and Günsche. Linge recalled only one temple wound–usually as being on Hitler's right side. Günsche reportedly told the Soviets that he did not see the wound himself, but in his 1956 court testimony and later interviews stated that he also saw an entry wound to the right temple.

In 1995, German historian Anton Joachimsthaler theorized that after Hitler shot himself, the bullet passed through one temple and became lodged inside the other, rupturing in a hematoma that looked like the exit wound described by "several witnesses", although Axmann's version is evidently singular. Joachimsthaler cites a 1925 German study concluding that, based upon 47 cases of 7.65-mm gunshots to living bodies, it is not uncommon for a bullet to become lodged or shatter within; he does not mention that in two cases shots were fired transversely to the temple at contact range, both resulting in an exit.

== See also ==
- Glossary of Nazi Germany
- List of Nazi Party leaders and officials
- Downfall, 2004 German film where he was portrayed by actor Alexander Styopin

== Bibliography ==
- Angolia, John (1989). For Führer and Fatherland: Political & Civil Awards of the Third Reich. R. James Bender Publishing. ISBN 978-0912138169.
- Beevor, Antony (2002). Berlin: The Downfall 1945. Viking-Penguin. ISBN 978-0-670-03041-5.
- Brisard, Jean-Christophe and Parshina, Lana (2018). The Death of Hitler. Boston: Da Capo Press. ISBN 978-0306922589.
- Fischer, Thomas (2008). Soldiers of the Leibstandarte. Winnipeg: J.J. Fedorowicz Publishing. ISBN 978-0-921991-91-5.
- Hamilton, Charles (1984). Leaders & Personalities of the Third Reich, Vol. 1. San Jose, CA: R. James Bender Publishing. ISBN 0-912138-27-0.
- Joachimsthaler, Anton (1999) [1995]. The Last Days of Hitler: The Legends, The Evidence, The Truth. Brockhampton Press. ISBN 1-86019-902-X.
- Klee, Ernst (2007). Das Personenlexikon zum Dritten Reich. Wer war was vor und nach 1945. Frankfurt-am-Main: Fischer-Taschenbuch-Verlag. ISBN 978-3-596-16048-8.
- Lang, Jochen von (1979). The Secretary. Martin Bormann: The Man Who Manipulated Hitler. New York: Random House. ISBN 978-0-394-50321-9.
- Le Tissier, Tony (2010) [1999]. Race for the Reichstag: The 1945 Battle for Berlin. Pen and Sword. ISBN 978-1-84884-230-4.
- Linge, Heinz (2009) [1980]. With Hitler to the End. Frontline Books–Skyhorse Publishing. ISBN 978-1-60239-804-7.
- McNab, Chris (2013). Hitler's Elite: The SS 1939-45. Osprey Publishing. ISBN 978-1782000884.
- Trevor-Roper, Hugh (2002) [1947]. The Last Days of Hitler. London: Pan Books. ISBN 978-0-330-49060-3.
- Vinogradov, V. K. (2005). Hitler's Death: Russia's Last Great Secret from the Files of the KGB. Chaucer Press. ISBN 978-1-904449-13-3.
