= Arthur Adam =

German army officer in World War II

- Allegiance: Nazi Germany
- Branch: German Army
- Rank: Wachtmeister (Master Sergeant)
- Conflicts: Second World War

Arthur Adam was the Chief Telephonist at Adolf Hitler's Wolfschanze HQ at East Prussia. Adam was a Wachtmeister (Master sergeant) in the German Army.

== Bomb attempt against Hitler ==
When Colonel Count Claus Schenk von Stauffenberg carried out a bomb attempt against Hitler's life on 20 July 1944, it was first supposed that it had been a time bomb left by the workers of the Todt Organization who had been renovating the bunkers in the period just before.

In the following hours, von Stauffenberg was not a suspect. Arthur Adam's telephone hall was next to the vestibule where Stauffenberg had left his cap and his belt.

At this time, the Chief Telephonist Arthur Adam who had seen Stauffenberg running away from the HQ, leaving his belongings behind did not know what to do. He walked about the site of the explosion. It was not his duty to take part in the investigation, however, he wanted to tell the investigators what he saw.

He systematically tried to approach various army officers to report that he saw the suspicious Stauffenberg escapade. However, he was often called to attention and reminded not to raise suspicion against such a highly reputed colonel.

Adam went to see Hitler's personal adjutant Heinz Linge to inform him that Colonel von Stauffenberg had left the conference room and got straight into a car.

They ended up telling the story to Martin Bormann, Hitler's Secretary and in practice, the most powerful man in the Nazi Party after Hitler himself.

Adam told Bormann that he was sure that Stauffenberg must have committed the attempt against the Führer's life, as he saw the colonel leaving the conference in a hurry without his cap, his valise and his belt. Bormann did not hesitate for a moment and took Adam directly before Hitler. When Hitler heard Adam's testimony, he is supposed to have declared: “Stauffenberg is the perpetrator of the attack! Arrest him immediately!”

For identifying Stauffenberg, Adam received a bonus (of 30,000 or 20,000 Reichsmark) and a (large or small) house in Berlin.

He is described as being the chief intelligence officer in the Chancellery of the Reich on 26 April 1945.
