= Svetlana About Svetlana =

Svetlana about Svetlana
- Release date: 2008
- Country: United States
- Languages: English, Russian

Svetlana about Svetlana is a 2008 film that explores the life and literary works of Svetlana Alliluyeva, Joseph Stalin's daughter. It is the story of Lana Parshina and her attempt to find Svetlana Alliluyeva and, ultimately, to find some answers to the questions about Alliluyeva's autobiographical book Twenty Letters to a Friend that Lana read when she was ten.
