= Lana Parshina =

American film producer (born 1978)

Svetlana "Lana" Parshina (born September 3, 1978) is a journalist and film producer. Raised in Moscow, she moved to the United States at 21. With multiple academic degrees, Lana Parshina initially worked as a Russian/English/German interpreter who had worked on projects with Library of Congress, a freelance journalist, and a public relations consultant/crisis manager in New York City. But, filmmaking was her passion and she left a vibrant career in crisis management to embrace her dream. In several years, she had produced a number of independent films. Svetlana about Svetlana, a documentary on Joseph Stalin's daughter – Svetlana Alliluyeva – was her directorial debut. Svetlana about Svetlana is used by many Ivy League Universities, such as Princeton, Yale, Stanford, as an audio-visual supplement to teaching 20th Century history classes. It is distributed in the US/Canada by Icarus Films. In 2010, Parshina directed "360 Around the World" documentary about a Swiss pilot Riccardo Mortara breaking the world record in circumnavigating the globe aboard a 30-year-old Sabreliner 65. In 2016, she directed "Singer who Fell" about a 105-year-old student of Konstantin Stanislavski, who still taught vocals in her Moscow apartment.
