= Reichssicherheitsdienst =

SS security service of Nazi Germany

Reich Security Service (RSD)
- Reichssicherheitsdienst
- The RSD was a branch of the SS.

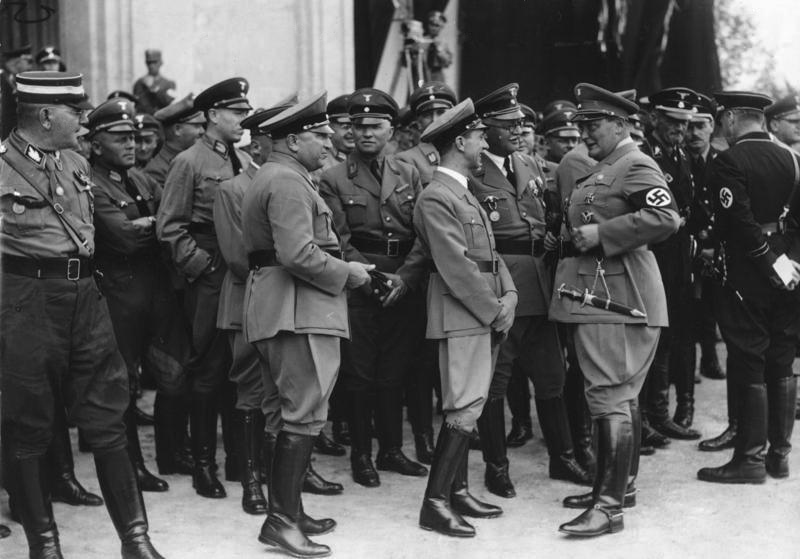
- RSD stand among dignitaries at the arrival of Joseph Goebbels and Hermann Göring in Nürnberg, 1936.

Agency overview
- Formed: March 15, 1933
- Preceding agencies: Führerschutzkommando; SS-Begleitkommando des Führers
- Dissolved: May 8, 1945
- Type: Security Service
- Jurisdiction: Nazi Germany and Nazi-occupied Europe
- Headquarters: Prinz-Albrecht-Straße, Berlin; 52°30′26″N 13°22′57″E
- Minister responsible: Heinrich Himmler 1931–1945, Reichsführer-SS
- Agency executive: SS-Gruppenführer Johann Rattenhuber (1933–1945)
- Parent agency: Schutzstaffel

The Reichssicherheitsdienst (RSD, lit. "Reich Security Service") was a Schutzstaffel (SS) security force of Nazi Germany. Originally bodyguards for Adolf Hitler, it later provided men for the protection of other high-ranking leaders of the Nazi regime from 1933 to 1945.

Its role included personal security, investigation of assassination plots, surveillance of locations before the arrival of Nazi dignitaries and vetting buildings as well as guests. The RSD had the power to request assistance from any other SS organisations and take command of all Ordnungspolizei (order police) in its role protecting the Nazi functionaries.

Although similar in name, the RSD was completely separate from the Sicherheitsdienst (SD), the formal intelligence service for the SS.

== Formation ==
The RSD was founded on 15 March 1933 as the Führerschutzkommando ("Führer protection command"; FSK) under the command of then SS-Standartenführer Johann Rattenhuber and his deputy Peter Högl. Originally charged with protecting Adolf Hitler while he was inside the borders of Bavaria, its initial members consisted of Kriminalpolizei detectives of the Bavarian police. Since the small group was made up of Bavarian police officers, they could only operate within the area of their authority. Hitler's protection outside Bavaria was already entrusted to an eight-member bodyguard known as the SS-Begleitkommando des Führers, which was founded on 29 February 1932. Hitler wanted a home-grown close protection group while in Munich because this was the traditional birthplace of the Nazi Party and where any plots would therefore have added significance. In the spring of 1934, the Führerschutzkommando replaced the SS-Begleitkommando for Hitler's overall protection throughout Germany. In 1935, the FSK squad for Hitler's protection was made up of 17 men. An additional force of 76 FSK men protected other leading members of the party, including Hermann Göring, Rudolf Hess, Joseph Goebbels and Heinrich Himmler; along with performing other security related duties.

The FSK was officially renamed the Reichssicherheitsdienst ("Reich Security Service"; RSD) on 1 August 1935. Himmler, the chief of the Schutzstaffel (SS) finally gained full control over the RSD in October 1935. Although Himmler was officially named chief, Rattenhuber remained in command and took his orders for the most part from Hitler or one of his chief aides such as Julius Schaub. In practice, Himmler was given administrative control over the RSD and could thereby integrate its members into the SS. The SS-Begleitkommando was later expanded and renamed the Führerbegleitkommando (Führer Escort Command; FBK). The RSD and FBK were both responsible for Hitler's close personal protection, but would operate under separate commands until April 1945.

== Pre-war role ==
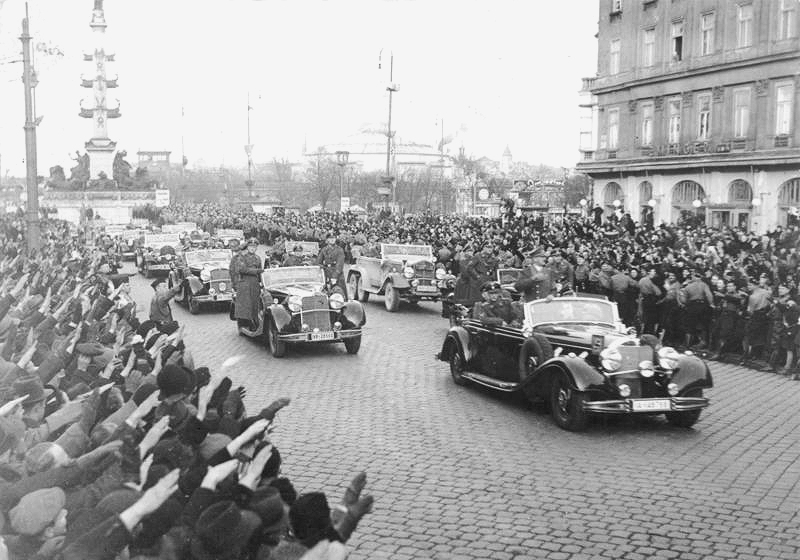
Hitler's motorcade with FBK and RSD escort cars to the left and right behind his car, as they head towards the city center of Vienna in 1938

The RSD and FBK worked together for security and personal protection during Hitler's trips and public events, but they operated as two groups and used separate vehicles. For those occasions, Rattenhuber would be in overall command and the FBK chief would act as his deputy. Before a trip, the RSD had the responsibly of checking the route, the buildings along the route, and the places which Hitler was to visit. The local Gestapo office would provide intelligence reports, along with information as to any assassination rumours, to the RSD. For motorcades, following Hitler's Mercedes-Benz would be two cars to the left and right, one with FBK men and the other with a detachment of RSD men.

In 1936, a resolution of the Oberkommando der Wehrmacht gave members of the RSD the status of being Wehrmacht officers, but with authority that included extra jurisdictional powers and privileges. It was formally called the Reichssicherheitsdienst Gruppe Geheime Feldpolizei z. b. V (Reich Security Service Group Secret Field Police for special duties/zur besondere Verwendung). They were considered military police officers that were technically on the staff of Reichsfuhrer-SS Himmler with its personnel wearing the uniform of the SS with the Sicherheitsdienst (SD) diamond on the lower left sleeve. Those who were eligible to claim SS membership could join the RSD and all officers had to present proof that they were of German blood. In 1937, all RSD officers were made members of the SS, breaking the link to the Wehrmacht. By that year, the RSD had 100 men in its ranks.

== Wartime operations ==
Upon the outbreak of World War II in 1939, the RSD had 200 men in its ranks. It protected Hitler, along with other government and inner circle members as they travelled around occupied Europe. By 1944, there were seventeen RSD units protecting the top leadership. As RSD commander, Rattenhuber was responsible for securing Hitler's field headquarters. In particular, a battalion guarded the Wolf's Lair near the town of Rastenburg, now Kętrzyn in Poland. Rattenhuber's deputy, Högl was appointed Chief of RSD Department 1, which was responsible for the personal protection of Hitler on a day-to-day basis during the war. The Wolf's Lair had three security zones: Sperrkreis 1 (Security Zone 1) was located at the heart of the Wolf's Lair, ringed by steel fencing and guarded by RSD and FBK men, it contained Hitler's bunker and ten other camouflaged bunkers built from 2 metres (6 ft 7 in) thick steel-reinforced concrete. Hitler first arrived at the Wolf's Lair on 23 June 1941 and departed for the last time on 20 November 1944. Overall, he spent over 800 days there during that three-and-a-half-year period.

In January 1945, as Germany's military situation was on the verge of total collapse, Rattenhuber accompanied Hitler and his entourage into the bunker complex under the Reich Chancellery garden in the central government sector of Berlin. The FBK and the rest of Hitler's personal staff moved into the Vorbunker and Führerbunker. Both FBK and RSD men were stationed outside the Führerbunker entrances. Main entry into the Führerbunker was from a stairway built at right angles leading down from the Vorbunker. After descending the stairs into the lower section, RSD and FBK men were positioned in a guard room to check identity cards and search briefcases, before personnel were allowed to pass into the corridor of the Führerbunker proper.

In late April, it was clear to the Nazi leadership that the Battle of Berlin would be the final battle of the war, as the Red Army rapidly approached the capital. On 27 April 1945, Högl was sent out to find Himmler's liaison man, SS-Gruppenführer Hermann Fegelein, who had deserted his post at the Führerbunker. Fegelein was caught by Högl's RSD squad in his Berlin apartment, wearing civilian clothes and preparing to flee to Sweden or Switzerland. He was carrying cash (German marks and foreign currency) and jewellery, some of which belonged to Hitler's longtime companion Eva Braun. Högl also uncovered a briefcase containing documents with evidence of Himmler's attempted peace negotiations with the Western Allies. Fegelein was brought back to the Führerbunker and then shot on 28 April. After Hitler committed suicide on 30 April, Rattenhuber, Högl and the remaining RSD officers attempted a break-out from central Berlin to avoid capture. Högl was killed while crossing the Weidendammer Bridge while Rattenhuber was taken prisoner by Red Army soldiers. After the war ended, Rattenhuber served 10 years in prison in the Soviet Union before being released on 10 October 1955.

== See also ==
- Führerbegleitbrigade, an armored unit of the German Army which provided Hitler with battlefield security.
- Feldgendarmerie, the German military police in World War II.
