= Wilhelm Burgdorf =

German army general (1895–1945)

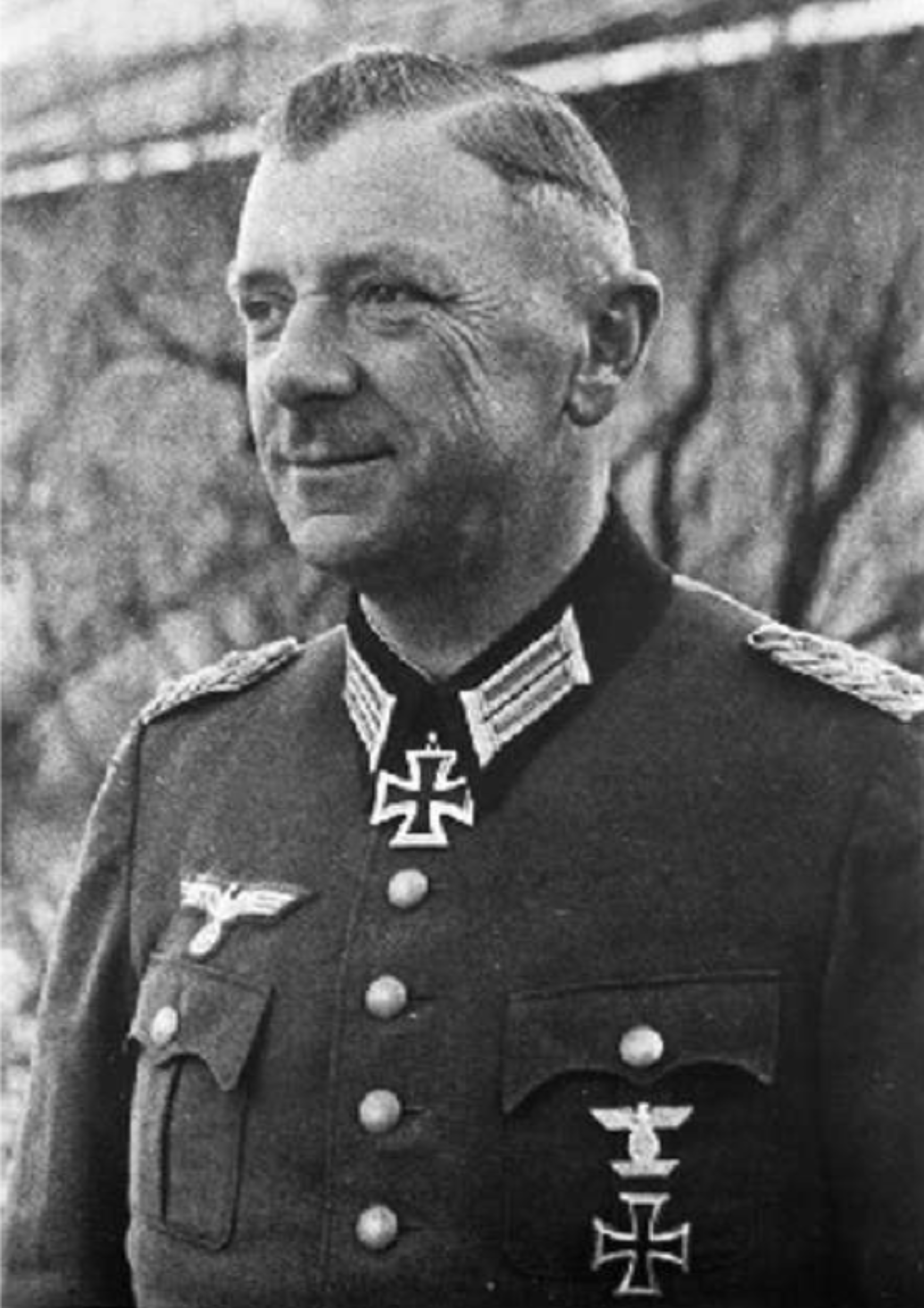
- Burgdorf in 1940

Chief of the Army Personnel Office
- In office 12 October 1944 – 2 May 1945
- Preceded by: Rudolf Schmundt
- Succeeded by: Office abolished

Chief adjutant to Adolf Hitler
- In office 12 October 1944 – 30 April 1945

Personal details
- Born: 15 February 1895 Fürstenwalde, Province of Brandenburg, Kingdom of Prussia, German Empire
- Died: 2 May 1945 (aged 50) Berlin, Germany
- Cause of death: Suicide by gunshot

Military service
- Allegiance: German Empire; Weimar Republic; Nazi Germany
- Branch/service: Imperial German Army; Prussian Army; Reichswehr; German Army
- Years of service: 1914–1945
- Rank: General der Infanterie
- Unit: 12th Grenadier Regiment; 529th Infantry Regiment
- Commands: Army Personnel Office; 529th Infantry Regiment
- Battles/wars: World War I; World War II; Invasion of Poland; Battle of France; Operation Barbarossa; Battle of Berlin ‡‡
- Awards: Iron Cross, 1st and 2nd class Clasp to the Iron Cross, 1st and 2nd class Knight's Cross of the Iron Cross; Eastern Medal

Wilhelm Emanuel Burgdorf (15 February 1895 – 2 May 1945) (Note: Burgdorf apparently committed suicide after midnight on 2 May, although some other sources state it occurred before midnight on 1 May.) was a German army general who rose to prominence during the final years of World War II. Burgdorf served as a commander of 529th Infantry Regiment from May 1940 to April 1942 (part of the 299th Infantry Division). In October 1944, Burgdorf assumed the role of the chief of the Army Personnel Office and chief adjutant to Adolf Hitler. In this capacity, he played a key role in the forced suicide of Field Marshal Erwin Rommel. Burgdorf committed suicide inside the Führerbunker on 2 May 1945 at the conclusion of the Battle of Berlin.

== Early life and education ==
Burgdorf was born on 15 February 1895 in Fürstenwalde, Province of Brandenburg, Kingdom of Prussia, German Empire.

== Military career ==
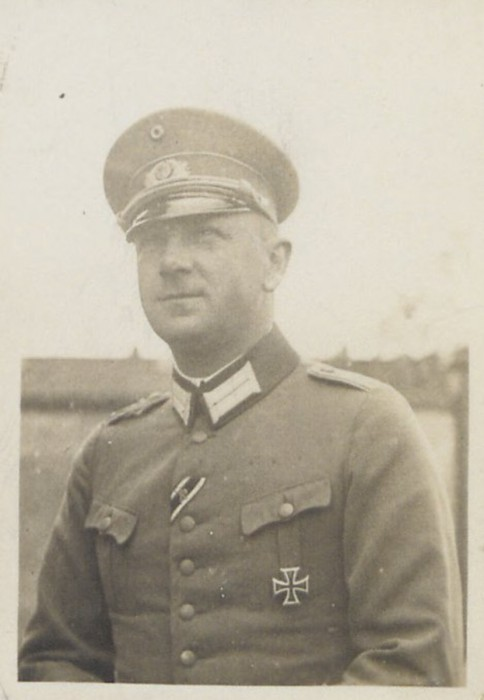
Wilhelm Burgdorf during the Weimar Republic

Burgdorf joined the Prussian Army at the outbreak of World War I as an officer cadet and was commissioned as an infantry officer in Grenadier Regiment 12 in 1915. After the war he served in the Reichswehr and was promoted to captain in 1930. In the Wehrmacht, he became an instructor in tactics at the military academy in Dresden with the rank of major in 1935 and was appointed an adjutant on the staff of the IX corps in 1937. He was promoted to lieutenant colonel in 1938 and served as the commander of the 529th Infantry Regiment from May 1940 to April 1942. In May 1942, he became Chief of Department 2 of the Army Personnel Office. Burgdorf became the Deputy Chief in October 1942, when he was promoted to Generalmajor.

Burgdorf was promoted to chief of the Army Personnel Office and chief adjutant to Adolf Hitler in October 1944. At that time, he was further promoted in rank to Generalleutnant, and one month later (on 1 November 1944) to the rank of General der Infanterie. Burgdorf retained that rank and position until his death.

=== Operation Valkyrie and the Court of Honor ===
Following the 20 July plot to murder Hitler, which included notable members from within Germany's aristocracy and military command staff, a court was assembled to judge and condemn the conspirators. Burgdorf was one of the many members of Roland Freisler's so-called Court of Honor brought together to pass judgment, along with generals von Rundstedt, Keitel, Guderian, Schroth, Kriebel, Maisel, Kircheim, and Specht. Upwards of 200 persons or more—military and non-military alike—were executed in the wake of the 20 July events.

=== Role in Rommel's death ===
Burgdorf played a key role in the death of Field Marshal Erwin Rommel, who had been implicated as having a peripheral role in the plan to assassinate Hitler. On 14 October 1944, Burgdorf, with General Ernst Maisel, arrived at the Rommel household. Burgdorf informed Rommel of the charges and, following the instructions of Field Marshal Wilhelm Keitel, offered him three choices: (1) report to Hitler and plead not guilty; (2) admit guilt, take poison, receive a state funeral and obtain immunity for his family and staff; or (3) face a trial for treason. (Note: Two generals from Hitler's headquarters, Burgdorf and Ernst Maisel, visited Rommel at his home on 14 October 1944. "Burgdorf had with him copies of the interrogations of von Hofacker, von Stülpnagel and Speidel, along with a letter written by Keitel ostensibly dictated by Hitler himself. In the letter, the Führer gave Rommel an impossible choice: if he believed himself innocent of the allegations against him, then Rommel must report to Hitler in person in Berlin; refusal to do so would be considered an admission of guilt, his arrest, trial, and conviction would be inevitable. As a final gesture of respect, the Führer had allowed that Rommel be permitted to take his own life; Burgdorf had brought a fast-acting poison with him for that purpose.") Rommel decided on the second option and briefed his wife and son before leaving with Burgdorf and Maisel. Rommel's family received a telephone call ten minutes later informing them that Rommel had committed suicide.

=== Battle of Berlin ===
Shortly before the Battle of Berlin, Philipp Freiherr von Boeselager overheard Burgdorf say: "When the war is over, we will have to purge, after the Jews, the Catholic officers in the army."

Burgdorf joined Hitler in the Führerbunker when the Soviets assaulted Berlin. On 28 April, Hitler discovered that Heinrich Himmler tried to negotiate a surrender to the western Allies via Count Folke Bernadotte. Burgdorf took part in Hitler's court-martial of Hermann Fegelein, Himmler's SS liaison officer and Eva Braun's brother-in-law. SS-General Wilhelm Mohnke presided over the tribunal, which included SS-General Johann Rattenhuber and General Hans Krebs. Fegelein was so drunk that he was crying, vomiting and unable to stand up; he even urinated on the floor. It was the opinion of the judges that he was in no condition to stand trial. Therefore, Mohnke closed the proceedings and turned Fegelein over to Rattenhuber and his security squad.

On 29 April 1945, Burgdorf, Krebs, Joseph Goebbels, and Martin Bormann witnessed and signed Hitler's last will and testament. After Hitler's suicide on 30 April 1945, Goebbels assumed Hitler's role as chancellor. On 1 May, Goebbels dictated a letter to Soviet Army Marshall Vasily Chuikov, requesting a temporary ceasefire, and ordered General Krebs to deliver it. Chuikov commanded the Soviet forces in central Berlin, but demanded unconditional surrender. After this was rejected, Goebbels decided that further efforts were futile. Goebbels then launched into a tirade berating the generals, reminding them Hitler forbade them to surrender. Ministerialdirektor Hans Fritzsche left the room to take matters into his own hands. He went to his nearby office on Wilhelmplatz and wrote a surrender letter addressed to Soviet Marshal Georgy Zhukov. General Burgdorf followed Fritzsche to his office. There he asked Fritzsche if he intended to surrender Berlin. Fritzsche replied that he was going to do just that. Burgdorf shouted that Hitler had forbidden surrender and as a civilian he had no authority to do so. Burgdorf then pulled his PPK to shoot Fritzsche, but a radio technician "knocked the gun" and the bullet misfired, hitting the ceiling. Several men then hustled Burgdorf out of the office and he returned to the bunker.

After midnight, in the early hours of 2 May 1945, following the earlier suicides of Hitler and Goebbels, Burgdorf and his colleague Chief of Staff Hans Krebs committed suicide together by gunshot to the head. The Soviets found the bodies of Krebs and Burgdorf in the bunker complex.

== Awards and decorations ==
- Iron Cross (1914) 2nd Class (24 January 1915) & 1st Class (14 August 1916)
- Knight's Cross of the Royal House Order of Hohenzollern with Swords (27 August 1917)
- Military Merit Cross, 3rd class with war decoration (Austria-Hungary, 27 February 1918)
- Knight's Cross, 2nd class of the Friedrich Order with Swords (18 July 1918)
- Hanseatic Cross of Hamburg (18 October 1918)
- The Honour Cross of the World War 1914/1918 (20 December 1934)
- Wehrmacht Long Service Award 2nd Class (2 October 1936)
- Clasp to the Iron Cross (1939) 2nd Class (15 June 1940) & 1st Class (17 June 1940)
- Knight's Cross of the Iron Cross on 29 September 1941 as Oberst and commander of Infanterie-Regiment 529

== Dates of rank ==
1938:	Oberstleutnant
October 1942:	Generalmajor
October 1944:	Generalleutnant
1 November 1944:	General der Infanterie

== See also ==
- Last will and testament of Adolf Hitler
- The Desert Fox, 1951 film in which Burgdorf is portrayed by Everett Sloane
- Downfall, 2004 film where Burgdorf is portrayed by Justus von Dohnányi
