= Heinz Linge =

SS officer (1913–1980)

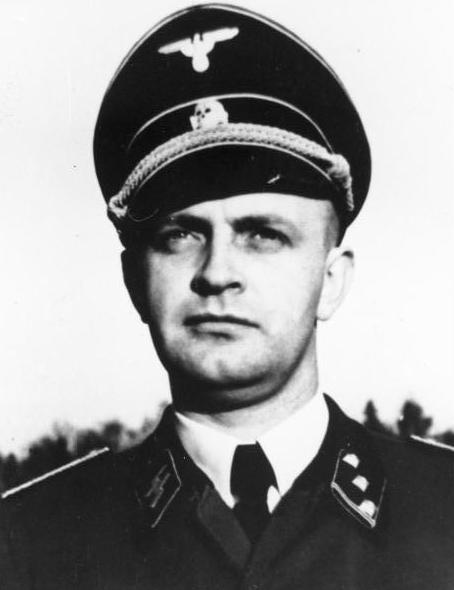
- Linge in 1935
- Born: 23 March 1913; Bremen, German Empire
- Died: 9 March 1980 (aged 66); Hamburg, West Germany
- Military career
- Allegiance: Nazi Germany
- Branch: Schutzstaffel
- Service years: 1933–1945
- Rank: SS-Sturmbannführer
- Units: 1st SS Division Leibstandarte SS Adolf Hitler; Führerbegleitkommando
- Conflicts: World War II; Battle of Berlin (POW)

Heinz Linge (23 March 1913 – 9 March 1980) was a German SS officer who served as a valet for Adolf Hitler, the leader of Nazi Germany. After ten years of service in that post, Linge was present in the Führerbunker when Hitler committed suicide on 30 April 1945. Afterwards, Linge spent ten years in Soviet captivity and was an important eyewitness regarding Hitler's death.

== Early life and education ==
Linge was born in Bremen, Germany. He was employed as a bricklayer prior to joining the SS in 1933. He served in the Leibstandarte SS Adolf Hitler (LSSAH), Hitler's bodyguard. In 1934, when he was part of No. 1 Guard to Hitler's residence on the Obersalzberg near Berchtesgaden, Linge was selected to serve at the Reich Chancellery. By 1945, he had obtained the rank of SS-Sturmbannführer (major).

== Valet to Hitler ==
On 24 January 1935, Linge was chosen to be a valet for Hitler. He was one of three valets at that time. In September 1939, Linge replaced Karl Wilhelm Krause as chief valet for Hitler. Linge worked as a valet in the Reich Chancellery in Berlin, at Hitler's residence near Berchtesgaden, and at Wolfsschanze in Rastenburg. He stated that his daily routine was to wake Hitler each day at 11:00 am and provide morning newspapers and messages. Linge would then keep him stocked with writing materials and spectacles for his morning reading session in bed. Hitler would then dress himself to a stopwatch with Linge acting as a "referee". He would take a light breakfast of tea, biscuits and an apple and a vegetarian lunch at 2:30 pm. Dinner with only a few guests present was at 8:00 pm. As Hitler's valet, Linge was also a member of the Führerbegleitkommando which provided personal security protection for Hitler. By 1944, he was also head of Hitler's personal service staff. Besides accompanying Hitler on all his travels, he was responsible for the accommodations; all the servants, mess orderlies, cooks, caterers and maids were "subordinate" to Linge.

=== Berlin 1945 ===
Linge was one of many soldiers, servants, secretaries, and officers who moved into the Reich Chancellery and Führerbunker in Berlin in 1945. There he continued as Hitler's chief valet and protocol officer and was one of those who closely witnessed the last days of Hitler's life during the Battle of Berlin. He was also Hitler's personal military orderly. Linge delivered messages to Hitler and escorted people in to meet with Hitler. In addition, after Hitler's personal physician Theodor Morell left Berlin on 23 April, Linge and Dr. Werner Haase administered to Hitler the prepared medicine which had been left behind.

On 25 April, Hitler instructed Linge to ensure his body was burned to avoid falling into Soviet hands. On 30 April, Hitler elaborated his suicide plan to Linge, telling him to wrap his and Eva Braun's bodies in blankets, take them up to the garden behind the Reich Chancellery and burn them. Linge later wrote that after Hitler and Braun were married, the dictator spent his final night lying awake and fully dressed on his bed.

On 30 April, Hitler had a last midday meal with his secretaries. Following the meal, Linge spoke briefly with Eva Braun. He described her as looking pale and of having had little sleep. She thanked him for his service. Hitler then said farewell to each of his servants and subordinates. Thereafter, Hitler retired to his study at 3:15 pm. Hitler instructed Linge to join one of the break-out groups and try to get to the west. Linge asked for whom they should now fight and Hitler replied, "For the coming man." Linge saluted and joined a number of SS guards near the bunker's emergency exit. After guessing that enough time had passed, Linge returned to the anteroom to Hitler's study, where he reportedly smelled gunpowder. He went to the map room and asked Hitler's private secretary Martin Bormann to join him. They entered the study and found the couple's bodies on the sofa. Linge concluded that Hitler had shot himself in the right temple and that Braun had taken cyanide. While Bormann went to get others to help move the bodies, Linge rolled up the bodies in blankets.

According to Linge, he helped move Hitler's corpse up the stairs to ground level and through the emergency exit to the Reich Chancellery garden, where the couple's bodies were doused with petrol. After the first attempts to ignite the petrol did not work, Linge went back inside the bunker and returned with a thick roll of papers. Bormann lit the papers and threw the torch onto the bodies. As the two corpses caught fire, a small group, including Bormann, Linge, Otto Günsche, Joseph Goebbels, Erich Kempka, Peter Högl, Ewald Lindloff, and Hans Reisser, raised their arms in salute as they stood just inside the bunker doorway.

At around 4:15 pm, Linge ordered SS-Untersturmführer Heinz Krüger and SS-Oberscharführer Werner Schwiedel to roll up the rug in Hitler's study to burn it. The two men removed the blood-stained rug, carried it up the stairs and outside to the Chancellery garden. There the rug was placed on the ground and burned. On and off during the afternoon, the Soviets shelled the area in and around the Reich Chancellery. SS guards brought over additional cans of petrol to further burn the corpses, which lasted from 4:00 pm to around 6:30 pm. Linge later wrote that he burned other personal effects of Hitler's while an SS bodyguard oversaw the burial of the burnt bodies in a shell crater.

Linge was one of the last to leave the Führerbunker in the early morning hours of 1 May 1945. He teamed up with Erich Kempka. Linge was later captured near See-Strasse. Several days later, after his identity was revealed, two Soviet officers escorted Linge by train to Moscow where he was incarcerated in the notorious Lubyanka Prison.

== Later life and death ==
Linge spent ten years in Soviet captivity and was released in 1955. Linge and Günsche were torturously interrogated by the Soviet People's Commissariat for Internal Affairs (NKVD; later superseded by the Ministry of Internal Affairs; MVD) about the circumstances of Hitler's death, at times kept in solitary confinement. The two shared a cell from mid-1948 to the end of 1949, during part of the time they provided details for a dossier edited by Soviet NKVD officers and presented to Joseph Stalin on 30 December 1949 (published in 2005 as The Hitler Book). Unlike Linge, Günsche hated working on the project and only begrudgingly gave the Soviets truthful information. Günsche reportedly tried to bring Linge around to his viewpoint and even leveraged threats to try and influence him.

Linge initially told the Soviets that he heard Hitler's suicide gunshot before explaining that he only said this to keep his account from appearing "frail" in light of "shadowy areas" of his memory. He also claimed to have learned of the suicide from the smell of gunpowder, although Hitler's rooms were well ventilated. Linge told the Soviets that he and Bormann could tell that Hitler and Braun were dead by looking at them, but did not explain why they did not summon Hitler's doctors to confirm the deaths. (Note: Kempka claimed that he saw Ludwig Stumpfegger make an examination, but later admitted that he was not himself in the bunker during Hitler's suicide, only arriving with petrol as the bodies were being moved.) He stated that he saw a coin-sized wound to Hitler's right temple with one or two trails of blood running down his cheek and no exit wound or other damage to the skull, though in his 1980 memoir he claimed to have made no close observations. Perhaps the only other witness to provide a detailed description of Hitler's head wound in the immediate aftermath of his death was Hitler Youth leader Artur Axmann, who reported blood on both temples but no clear entry wound. (Note: Although Linge said he was able to see the corpse's face well enough to notice that its eyes were open, Axmann incongruously attributed the damage to an oral gunshot and claimed the mouth was bloody.)

Günsche reportedly told the Soviets that he only learned of Hitler's method of death from Linge, but testified in 1956 that (like Linge) he saw an entry wound to the right temple, which convinced him that Hitler died by a suicide gunshot. (Note: Additionally, Günsche believed the suicides took place at 15:30 based on a reading of his watch. Linge placed them at 15:50 per a grandfather clock (personally maintained by him) in the study antechamber.) According to historian Mark Felton (who does not explain how he accessed the Soviet material), Linge reportedly told a Soviet agent—undercover as a captured German—that only he and Bormann knew the circumstances of Hitler's death; Linge repeatedly said he would not 'crack' to the Soviets and suggested that (from his apparently limited viewpoint) Hitler's temple wound seemed like it could have been painted on. Additionally, Linge recanted a statement to the Soviets that Braun had been wrapped in a blanket, later writing in his memoir that he wrapped her up in one.

In 1956, Linge provided testimony in a West German court investigating Hitler's death. In light of theories that Hitler had survived, Linge asserted (similar to a 1945 statement to the Soviets by Nazi propagandist Hans Fritzsche) that the dictator's body was never discovered. Linge stated that he based his opinion on the Soviets having repeatedly questioned him about it, surmising that the corpse remained, undisturbed, in a "common grave".

In 1980, Linge died in Hamburg, West Germany. His memoir, originally published in German in 1980 as Bis zum Untergang (English: 'Until the Fall') was published in English in July 2009 as With Hitler to the End with an introduction by historian Roger Moorhouse, the author of Killing Hitler. Its United States distributor summarizes that "Linge was responsible for all aspects of Hitler's household" and despite the circumstances of the war, Linge's portrayal of the dictator is "affectionate" though Hitler acted in an "unpredictable and demanding" manner.

== Film portrayals ==
Linge is portrayed by actor Thomas Limpinsel in Oliver Hirschbiegel's 2004 German film Downfall. In Hans-Jürgen Syberberg's Hitler: A Film from Germany (1977), he is played by Hellmut Lange. In the 1971 Eastern Bloc co-production Liberation V: The Final Assault, he was portrayed by East German actor Otto Busse.

== See also ==
- German prisoners of war in the Soviet Union
- Glossary of Nazi Germany
- List of Adolf Hitler's personal staff
  - Hans Hermann Junge – also served as valet to Hitler
  - Traudl Junge – secretary to Hitler
