= Wilhelm Mohnke =

German SS commander (1911–2001)

- Mohnke in 1944

Commander of the 1. SS Panzer Division Leibstandarte Adolf Hitler
- In office 20 August 1944 – 6 February 1945
- Preceded by: Theodor Wisch
- Succeeded by: Otto Kumm

Personal details
- Born: 15 March 1911 Lübeck, German Empire
- Died: 6 August 2001 (aged 90) Barsbüttel, Germany
- Awards: Knight's Cross of the Iron Cross; German Cross in Gold; War Merit Cross

Military service
- Allegiance: Nazi Germany
- Branch/service: Waffen-SS
- Years of service: 1931–1945
- Rank: SS-Brigadeführer and Generalmajor of the Waffen-SS
- Commands: 1. SS Panzer Division Leibstandarte Adolf Hitler; Kampfgruppe Mohnke (surrendered)
- Battles/wars: World War II

Wilhelm Mohnke (15 March 1911 – 6 August 2001) was a German brigadier general who was one of the original members of the Schutzstaffel SS-Stabswache Berlin ('Staff Guard Berlin') formed in March 1933. Mohnke, who had joined the Nazi Party in September 1931, rose through the ranks to become one of Adolf Hitler's last remaining general officers at the end of World War II in Europe.

Mohnke participated in the fighting in France, Poland and the Balkans as part of the 1. SS Panzer Division Leibstandarte Adolf Hitler. In 1943 he was appointed to command a regiment in the 12. SS Panzer Division Hitlerjugend. He led the unit in the Battle for Caen, receiving the Knight's Cross of the Iron Cross on 11 July 1944. Mohnke was given command of the Leibstandarte Adolf Hitler division during the Battle of the Bulge in December 1944.

While participating in the Battle of Berlin, Mohnke commanded Kampfgruppe Mohnke ('Combat Group Mohnke') and was charged with defending the government district, including the Reich Chancellery and the Reichstag.

He was investigated after the war for war crimes, which included allegations that he was responsible for the killing of prisoners in France in 1940, Normandy in June 1944 and Belgium in December 1944. Although Mohnke served 10 years in Soviet custody, he was never charged with any crimes, and died in 2001, aged 90.

== Early life and SS service ==
Mohnke was born in Lübeck on 15 March 1911. His father, who shared his name with his son, was a cabinetmaker. After his father's death, he went to work for a glass and porcelain manufacturer, eventually reaching a management position. He also held a degree in economics. Mohnke joined the Nazi Party with number 649,684 on 1 September 1931. Shortly thereafter, he joined the Schutzstaffel (SS) with number 15,541. Mohnke began with the rank of SS-Mann ('private'). After Adolf Hitler became Chancellor of Germany in January 1933, SS Headquarters in Berlin requested that all SS regiments submit three names of their best soldiers for transfer to a personal guard unit for Hitler. Mohnke was selected for the unit in March 1933. He was assigned to SS-Stabswache Berlin (SS-Staff Guard Berlin), which established its first guard at the original Reich Chancellery. By August, Mohnke was one of two company commanders. In September, the unit became known as the SS-Sonderkommando Berlin after the training units SS-Sonderkommando Zossen and SS-Sonderkommando Jüterbog merged with it under Dietrich's command. With the merger, Mohnke was transferred to the 2nd Battalion and given command of the 3rd Company. In November 1933, on the 10th anniversary of the Beer Hall Putsch, the Sonderkommando swore personal allegiance to Hitler. At the conclusion of the ceremony the unit received the new title, "Leibstandarte Adolf Hitler" (LAH). On 13 April 1934, Heinrich Himmler, head of the SS, ordered the Leibstandarte Adolf Hitler (LAH) to be renamed "Leibstandarte SS Adolf Hitler" (LSSAH).

== World War II ==
Mohnke took part in the invasion of Poland in September 1939. He was wounded on 7 September 1939 and recovered in the hospital in Prague. For this, Mohnke received the Wound Badge in Black. He was awarded the Iron Cross, Second Class on 29 September 1939 and the Iron Cross, First Class on 8 November 1939.

Mohnke led the 5th company of the 2nd Battalion of the Infanterie-Regiment Leibstandarte SS Adolf Hitler, at the outset of the Battle of France in 1940. He took command of the 2nd Battalion on 28 May after the battalion commander was wounded. It was around this time that Mohnke was allegedly involved in the killing of 80 British (of the 48th division) and French prisoners of war (POWs) near Wormhoudt. Mohnke was never brought to trial over these allegations, and when the case was reopened in 1988, a German prosecutor came to the conclusion there was insufficient evidence to bring charges. The case briefly resurfaced once again in late 1993 when it became evident that the British government had not revealed some pertinent files from its archives during the earlier investigation. However, nothing substantial came from this either.

He commanded the 2nd Battalion during the Balkans campaign, where he suffered a severe leg wound in a Yugoslavian air attack on 6 April 1941, the first day of the campaign. It was the decision of the medics that his leg would need to be amputated, but Mohnke overrode them. His wound was so serious that a part of his foot still had to be removed. On 26 December 1941, while still recuperating, Mohnke was awarded the German Cross in Gold. Mohnke returned to active service in 1942; he was transferred to a replacement battalion in March 1942.

=== SS Division Hitlerjugend ===
On 1 September 1943, 16,000 new recruits of the Hitlerjugend ('Hitler Youth') born in 1926 took part in the formation of the SS Division Hitlerjugend, while the senior NCOs and officers were generally veterans of the Eastern Front. SS-Obersturmbannführer Mohnke was given command of the 26th SS Panzergrenadier Regiment, which was the second regiment formed in the 12th SS Panzer Division Hitlerjugend.

Mohnke was implicated in the killing of 35 Canadian prisoners at Fontenay-le-Pesnel, as part of the Normandy Massacres, albeit he never faced a trial owing to a lack of conclusive proof of his involvement. Mohnke told historian Thomas Fischer that, at times, he had to take strong painkillers, such as morphine, due to the severe pain in his shortened right leg (from his combat injuries in April 1941) but whether these things affected his decision-making process is not known. What is known is that his physical health affected his deployment. Mohnke was commander of the Leibstandarte's replacement battalion from March 1942 till May 1943. Then being "free enough from pain", SS-Obersturmbannführer Kurt Meyer talked him into taking a command with the 12th SS Panzer Division. This led to commanding the 26th SS Pz-Gren Rgt on 15 September 1943.

While the 12th SS Panzer Division was fighting to keep the Falaise pocket open, in which the division suffered an estimated 40%-50% casualties, Mohnke withdrew his Kampfgruppe ('Battle Group') east of the river Dives. As the situation in Normandy deteriorated for Germany and the front was pushed back to the Seine, Mohnke was one of the few to lead organized resistance on the western bank in order to protect the river crossings there. Afterwards, Mohnke was awarded the Knight's Cross on 11 July 1944. He led this Kampfgruppe until 31 August, when he replaced the badly wounded Theodor Wisch as commander of the Leibstandarte (LSSAH).

=== Battle of the Bulge ===
Operation Watch on the Rhine, followed by Operation Nordwind were the final major offensives and last gambles Hitler made on the Western Front. The plan was for an armored push through the American lines, all the way to Antwerp to split the western Allies forces and buy the Germans time. Mohnke's SS Division Leibstandarte, attached to the I SS Panzer Corps, was the spearhead of the operation in the Ardennes. The fuel crisis in Germany meant that the LSSAH had insufficient amounts of fuel for the vehicles. On 16 December 1944 the operation began, with SS-Obersturmbannführer Joachim Peiper's Kampfgruppe leading the push to the Meuse.

By 0700 on 17 December 1944, Peiper's Kampfgruppe had seized the American fuel dump at Büllingen. At 1330 that same day, at a crossroads near Malmedy, men from Peiper's LSSAH formation shot and killed at least 68 United States POWs, in what became known as the Malmedy massacre. By the evening of 17 December, the leading element of the LSSAH was engaged with the 99th US Division at Stavelot. Mohnke's division was behind schedule by at least 36 hours by the end of the second day. The retreating U.S. troops blew up important bridges and fuel dumps that Mohnke and Peiper had counted on taking intact, further slowing the German advance. With each passing day, enemy resistance stiffened and by 24 December the advance was halted. On 1 January 1945, the Luftwaffe launched a series of attacks on Allied airfields but the operation was very costly for the Germans. They suffered losses which could not be replaced. By this time, the Allies had regrouped their forces and were ready to repulse any attacks launched by the Germans. The operation formally ended on 27 January 1945, and three days later Mohnke was promoted to SS-Brigadeführer. A short time later the LSSAH and I SS Panzer Corps were transferred to Hungary to try and bolster the crumbling situation there. Mohnke was injured in an air raid where he suffered, among other things, ear damage. He was removed from front-line service and put on the Führer reserve.

=== Battle of Berlin ===
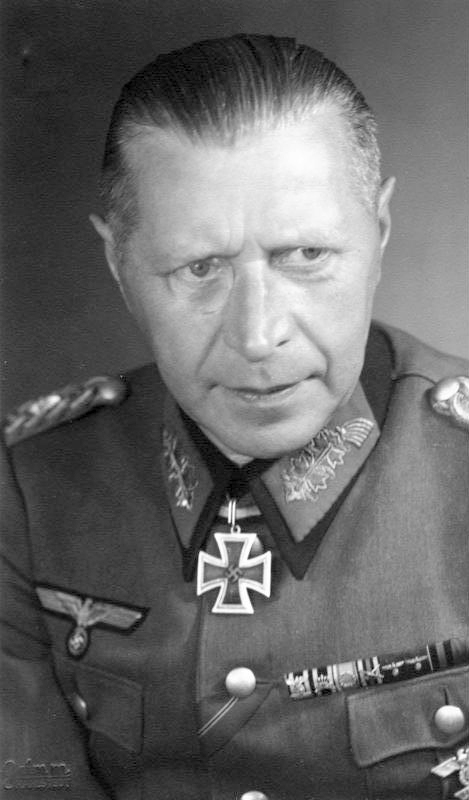
Helmuth Weidling in 1943

After recovering from his wounds, Mohnke was personally appointed by Hitler as the Kampfkommandant ('Battle Commander') for the defense of the centre government district of Berlin (Zitadelle sector), which included the Reich Chancellery and Führerbunker. Mohnke's command post was under the Reich Chancellery in the bunkers therein. He formed Kampfgruppe Mohnke ('Battle Group Mohnke') and it was divided into two weak regiments. It was made up of the LSSAH Flak Company, replacements from LSSAH Ausbildungs-und Ersatz Battalion from Spreenhagen under SS-Standartenführer Anhalt, 600 men from the Begleit-Bataillon Reichsführer-SS, the Führer-Begleit-Kompanie and the core group being the 800 men of the Leibstandarte (LSSAH) SS Guard Battalion (that was assigned to guard the Führer).

Although Hitler had appointed General Helmuth Weidling as defense commandant of Berlin, Mohnke remained free of Weidling's command to maintain his defense objectives of the Reich Chancellery and the Führerbunker. The combined total (for the city's defense) of Mohnke's SS Kampfgruppe, General Weidling's LVI Panzer Corps (and the other few units) totaled roughly 45,000 soldiers and 40,000 Volkssturm. They faced a superior number of Soviet Red Army soldiers. There were approximately 1.5 million Soviet troops allocated for the investment and assault on the Berlin Defence Area.

Since Mohnke's fighting force was located at the nerve center of the German Third Reich, it fell under intense artillery bombardment, which began on Hitler's birthday of 20 April 1945 and lasted to the end of local hostilities on 2 May 1945. Street fighting around the Reichstag and Reich Chancellery was bitter and bloody. For the Soviets, the Reichstag was the symbol of Nazi Germany and therefore of significant military and political value to capture.

While the Battle in Berlin was raging around them, Hitler ordered Mohnke to set up a military tribunal for SS-Gruppenführer Hermann Fegelein, adjutant to Heinrich Himmler, in order to try the man for desertion. The tribunal consisted of Generals Hans Krebs, Wilhelm Burgdorf, Johann Rattenhuber, and Mohnke himself. Years later, Mohnke told author James P. O'Donnell the following:

"I was to preside over it myself... I decided that the accused man [Fegelein] deserved trial by high-ranking officers... We set up the court-martial... We military judges took our seats at the table with the standard German Army Manual of Courts-Martial before us. No sooner were we seated than defendant Fegelein began acting up in such an outrageous manner that the trial could not even commence.

Roaring drunk..., Fegelein first brazenly challenged the competence of the court. He kept blubbering that he was responsible to...Himmler alone, not Hitler... He refused to defend himself. The man was in wretched shape – bawling, whining, vomiting, shaking like an aspen leaf...

I was now faced with an impossible situation. On the one hand, based on all available evidence, including his own earlier statements, this miserable excuse for an officer was guilty of flagrant desertion... Yet the German Army Manual states clearly that no German soldier can be tried unless he is clearly of sound mind and body, in a condition to hear the evidence against him... In my opinion and that of my fellow officers, Hermann Fegelein was in no condition to stand trial... I closed the proceedings... So I turned Fegelein over to [SS] General Rattenhuber and his security squad. I never saw the man again."

On 30 April, after receiving news of Hitler's suicide from SS-Sturmbannführer Otto Günsche, Mohnke took part in a conference where prior orders were implemented that those who could do so were to break out from the Soviet Red Army ring. The plan was to escape from Berlin to the Allies on the western side of the Elbe or to the German Army to the North. Prior to the breakout, Mohnke briefed all commanders (who could be reached) within the Zitadelle sector about the events as to Hitler's death and the planned breakout. They split up into ten main groups on 1 May 1945. Mohnke's group included secretary Traudl Junge, secretary Gerda Christian, secretary Else Krüger, Hitler's dietician, Constanze Manziarly, Ernst-Günther Schenck, and Walther Hewel. Mohnke planned to break out towards the German Army which was positioned in Prinzenallee. The group headed along the subway but their route was blocked so they went above ground and later joined hundreds of other Germans civilians and military personnel who had sought refuge at the Schultheiss-Patzenhofer Brewery on Prinzenallee. On 2 May 1945, General Weidling issued an order calling for the complete surrender of all German forces still in Berlin. Knowing they could not get through the Soviet encirclement, Mohnke decided to surrender to the Red Army. However, several of Mohnke's group (including some of the SS personnel) opted to commit suicide.

== Post-war ==
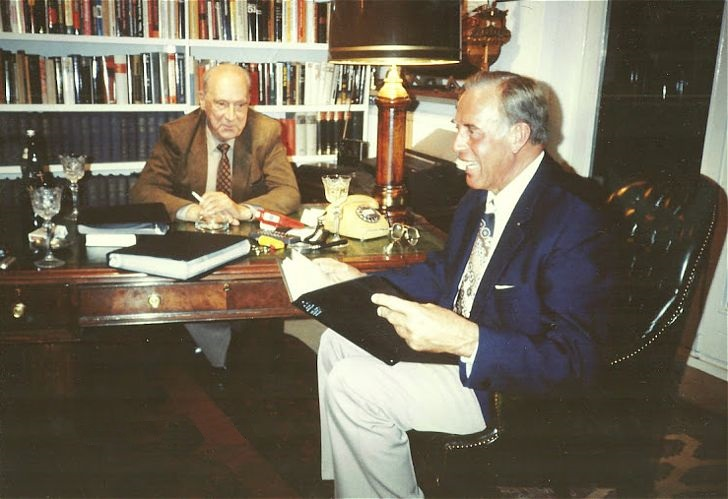
Mohnke (left) with Otto Günsche, 1999

Following their surrender, Mohnke and other senior German officers from Kampfgruppe Mohnke (including Dr. Schenck) were treated to a banquet by the Chief of Staff of the 8th Guards Army with the permission of Lieutenant General Vasily Chuikov. At 10:30 pm, the Germans were ushered out into another room where they were confined under guard. On the following night of 3 May, Mohnke and the rest of the Germans were handed over to the NKVD. On 9 May 1945, he was flown to Moscow for interrogation and kept in solitary confinement for six years, after being transferred to Lubyanka Prison. Mohnke was then transferred to the officers' prison camp in Voikovo. He remained in captivity until 10 October 1955.

Mohnke's regiment was involved in the killing of three Canadian prisoners of war in Normandy in 1944. Mohnke himself was investigated by Canadian authorities, but was not charged. There was a campaign by British Member of Parliament Jeff Rooker to prosecute Mohnke for his alleged involvement in war crimes in relation to the Wormhoudt massacre. Mohnke strongly denied the accusations, telling historian Thomas Fischer, "I issued no orders not to take English prisoners or to execute prisoners." After the case was reopened, a German prosecutor came to the conclusion there was insufficient evidence to bring charges.

Following his release, he worked as a dealer in small trucks and trailers, living in Barsbüttel, West Germany. In 1981 Gerd Heidemann, who knew Mohnke, gave him a look at the Hitler Diaries and asked him to check entries related to the Leibstandarte division. Mohnke noticed several mistakes in the diaries, which were ultimately proved to be forgeries. Mohnke died on 6 August 2001 in Barsbüttel-Hamburg, aged 90.

== Promotions ==
28 June 1933	Commissioned
1 October 1933	SS-Hauptsturmführer
1 September 1940	SS-Sturmbannführer
21 June 1943	SS-Obersturmbannführer
21 June 1944	SS-Standartenführer
4 November 1944	SS-Oberführer
30 January 1945	SS-Brigadeführer

== Awards ==
- Iron Cross Second Class 21 September 1939, First Class 8 November 1939
- War Merit Cross 2nd class with Swords 3 October 1940
- Infantry Assault Badge 3 October 1940
- Wound Badge in Silver 15 September 1941
- German Cross in Gold 26 December 1941 as SS-Sturmbannführer in the II./"Leibstandarte SS Adolf Hitler"
- Knight's Cross of the Iron Cross 11 July 1944 as SS-Obersturmbannführer and commander of SS-Panzergrenadier-Regiment 26.

== See also ==
- Downfall, 2004 German film where he was portrayed by actor André Hennicke
- Register of SS leaders in general's rank#List of SS-Brigadeführer

Military offices
Preceded by SS-Brigadeführer Theodor Wisch	Commander of 1st SS Division Leibstandarte SS Adolf Hitler; 20 August 1944 – 6 February 1945	Succeeded by SS-Brigadeführer Otto Kumm
