= Weidendammer Bridge =

Weidendammer Bridge Weidendammer Brücke (de)
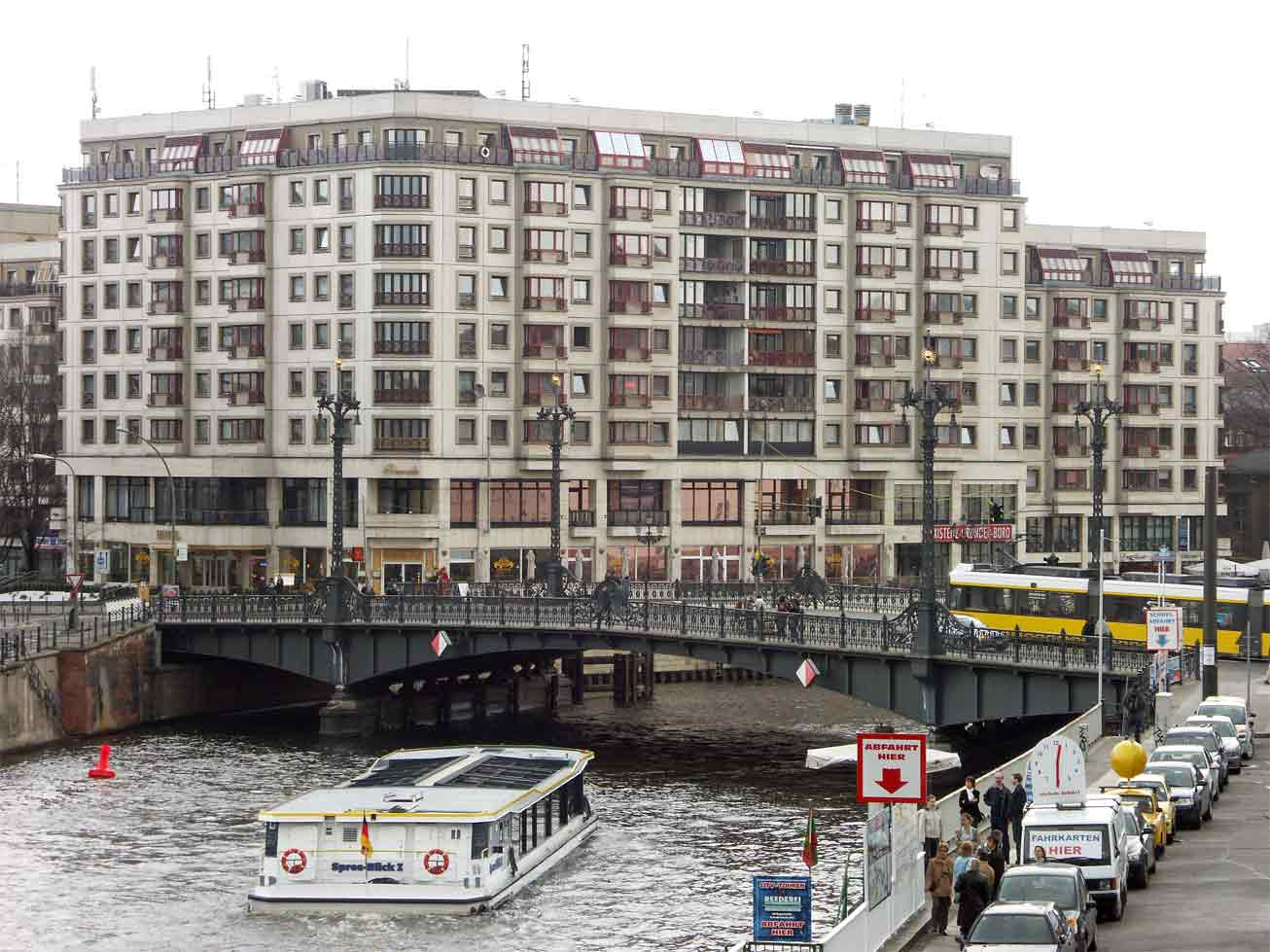
- Weidendammer Bridge in 2006
- Coordinates: 52°31′20″N 13°23′17″E
- Carries: Motor vehicles, trams, pedestrians and bicycles
- Crosses: Spree
- Locale: Berlin (Mitte)

Characteristics
- Total length: 73 m (240 ft)
- Width: 22.5 m (74 ft)
- Longest span: 38.5 m (126 ft)

History
- Designer: Otto Stahn
- Opened: 1896

Location
- Interactive map of Weidendammer Bridge; Weidendammer Brücke (de)

The Weidendammer Bridge is a 73-metre-long (240 ft) bridge where the Friedrichstraße crosses the Spree river in the central Mitte district of Berlin, Germany. It is notable for its ornate wrought iron railings, lanterns, and Imperial eagles.

== History ==
In 1685, a wooden drawbridge was built on the site in the course of the creation under Elector Frederick William I of Hohenzollern of a new western suburb of the city, Dorotheenstadt. Named after nearby willow (Weiden) trees on the riverbank, it was demolished for a cast iron construction erected in 1824, one of the first in Central Europe. Too small after the exponential population growth of Berlin as the capital of the German Empire, it was again replaced by the current bridge built between 1895 and 1896.

During the Battle of Berlin, the Weidendammer Bridge was one of the few Spree crossings that had not been destroyed. On the night of 1 May 1945, a Tiger tank from the 11th SS Panzergrenadier Division Nordland spearheaded an attempt to storm the bridge to allow hundreds of German soldiers and civilians to escape across it. The next day, Hitler's secretary Martin Bormann crossed the bridge in the last hours of his life under fire.

Lovers are known to lock padlocks engraved with their names onto the wrought-iron work on the bridge, and at times, these locks are removed by the authorities.

== Gallery ==
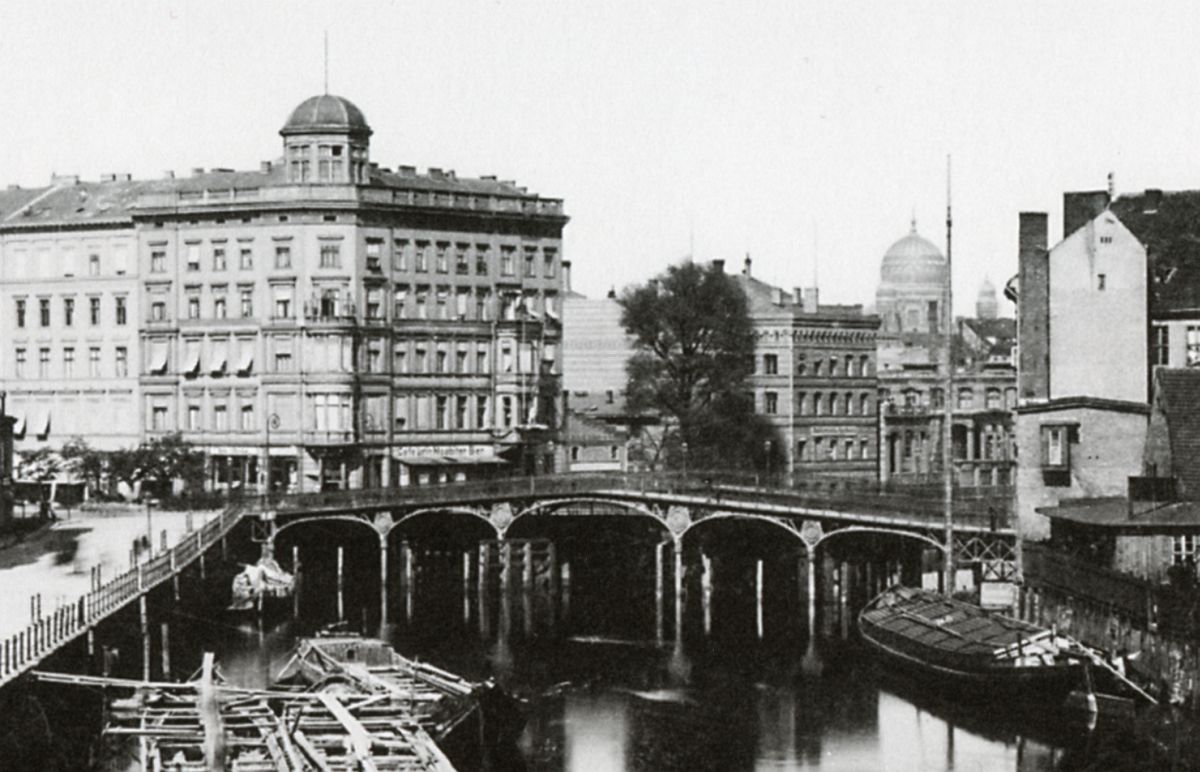
The bridge in 1881, in the background the New Synagogue

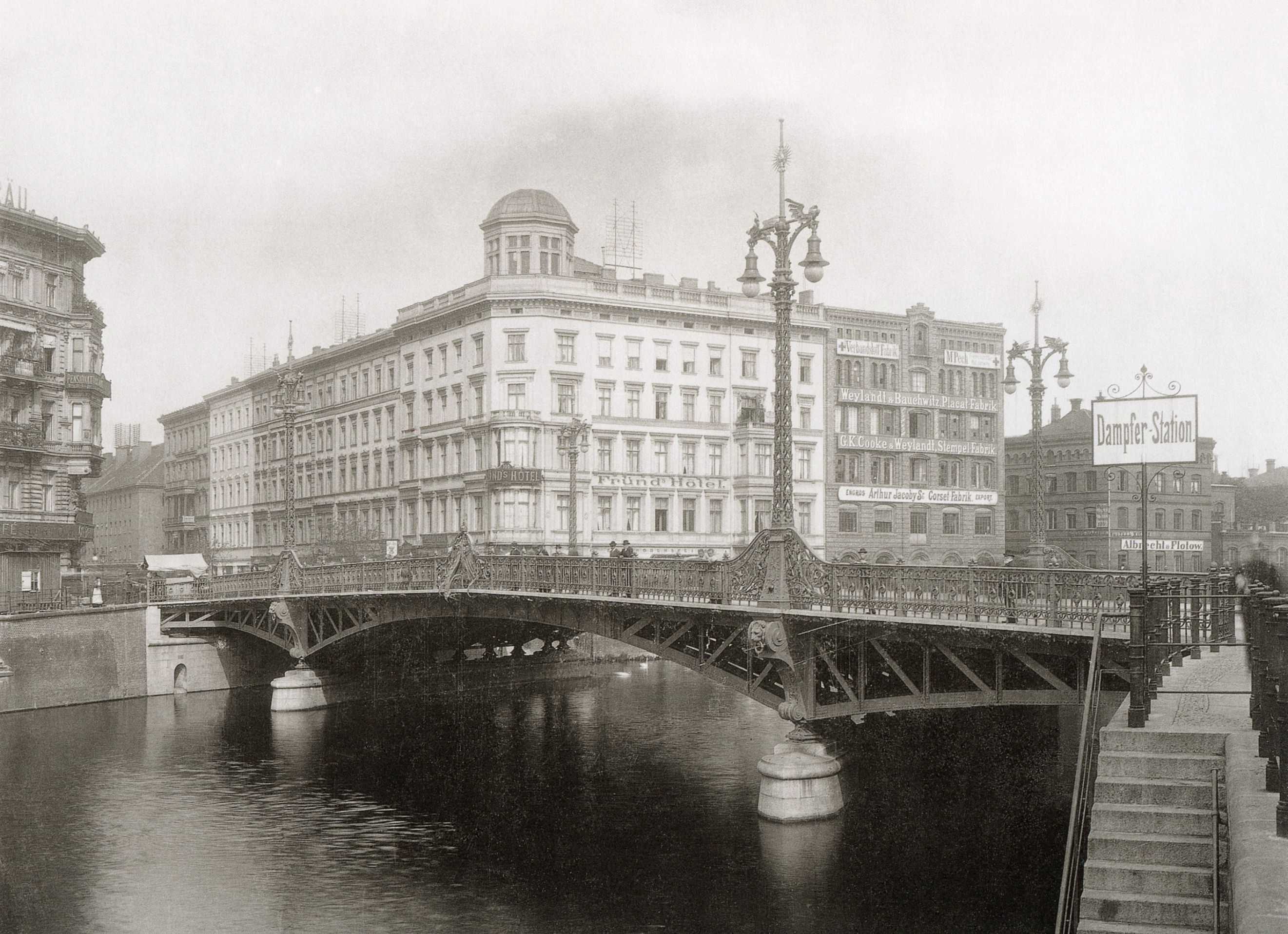
Weidendammer Bridge, 1897

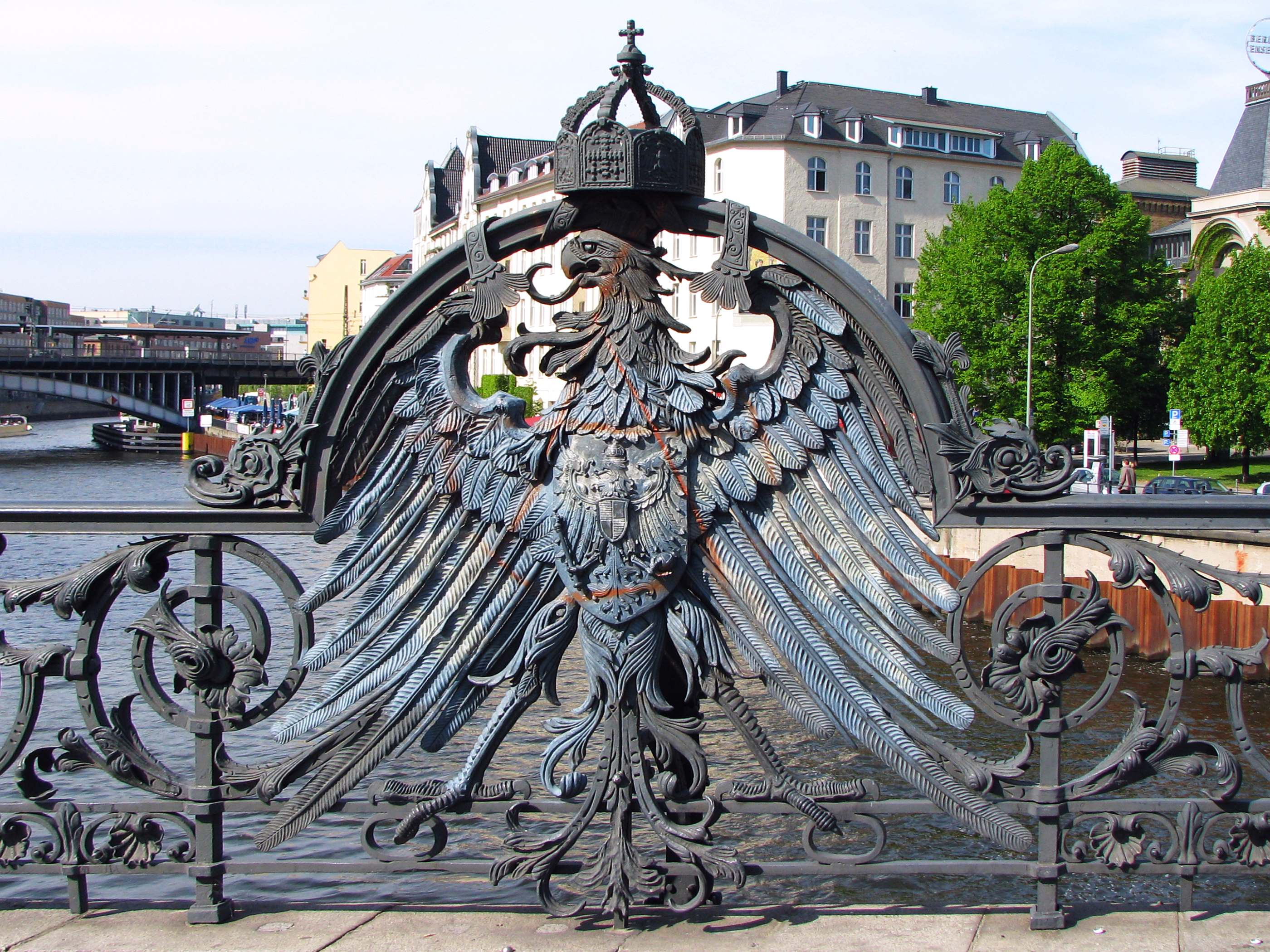
Wrought iron imperial eagle on the Weidendammer Bridge

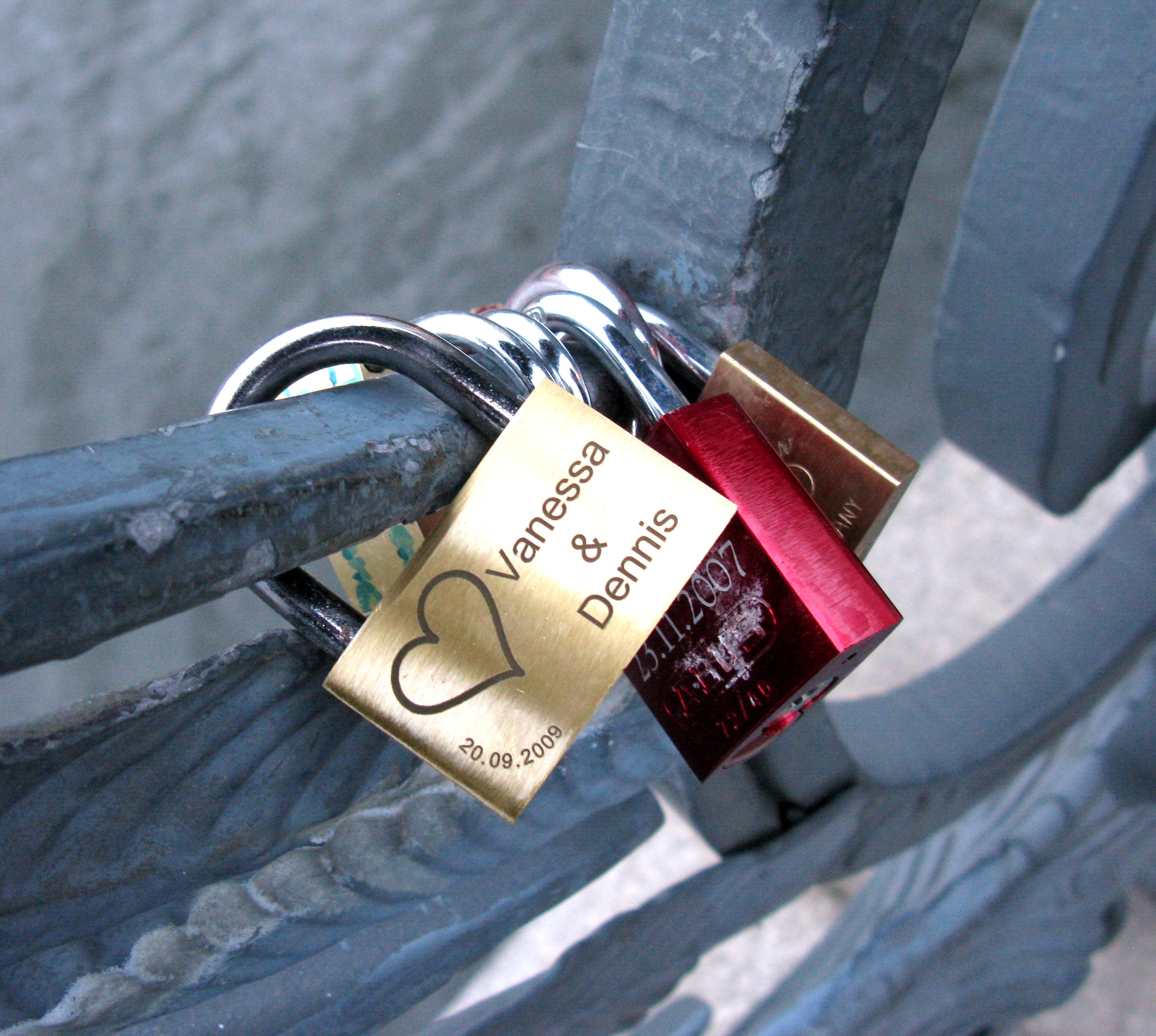
Padlocks engraved with the names of lovers, locked onto the wrought-iron railings of the Weidendammer bridge
