= Reich Plenipotentiary for Total War =

Nazi Germany official in charge of total war

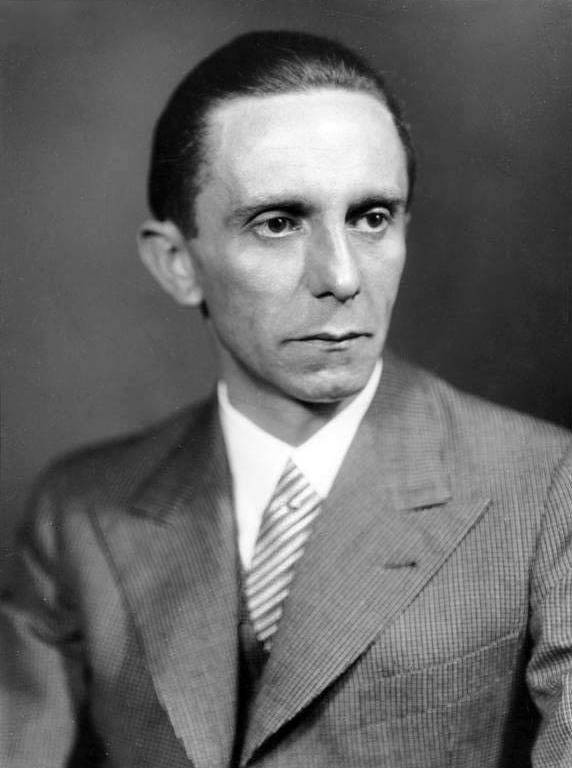
Joseph Goebbels in 1942

The Reich Plenipotentiary for the Total War Effort (Reichsbevollmächtigter für den totalen Kriegseinsatz) was a position created by Adolf Hitler, the Führer ("leader") of Nazi Germany, on 23 July 1944 for Joseph Goebbels, who was also at the time the regime's Propaganda Minister. The purpose of the new office was to rally the German people behind an effort to achieve "total war", in which all civilian resources and all aspects of civilian infrastructure are subordinated to the needs of the military and the war effort. The idea to create the new office, and to appoint Goebbels to it, had come from Goebbels himself. Hitler had acceded to it because of the rapid deterioration of the German military position in the war in the East against the Soviet Union; he had finally been convinced that only a total war effort could counter what Hitler felt was the constant undermining of his military strategies by his generals.

As Plenipotentiary, Goebbels was empowered to issue directives to all civilians and all parts of the civilian sector, as well as to the heads of even the highest agencies of the Reich, although in practical terms, his power was restricted by the complexities of the Nazi power structure. Goebbels and his staff endeavored to bring about a "structural transformation in the entire state apparatus."

== Background ==
Goebbels had been pushing for a total war effort for some time. He was convinced that everyone, from the Nazi elite to Germany's privileged classes, must be prepared to sacrifice for the war effort and was supportive of measures that restricted hunting, the prohibition of the use of alcohol at Nazi functions, and the scarcity measures of one-course meals that Hitler had in mind. As early as 4 January 1943, he told his ministerial conference that "we are confronted in the east with a brutal opponent who can only be defeated by the most brutal methods. In order to achieve this, the total commitment of all our resources and reserves is necessary," and he attempted to get Hitler to agree to a complete mobilization of the civilian population, for instance using women for work, and closing shops and cafes he considered to be luxuries. Hitler agreed, but little progress was made to put these measures into effect, besides the appointment of a "Committee of Three" to be in charge of the total war effort, which included Martin Bormann, the head of the Nazi Party Chancellery and Hitler's personal secretary, Hans Lammers, the head of the Reich Chancellery, and Wehrmacht General Wilhelm Keitel. Keitel, in particular, was aware of the military manpower shortage, and had complained in December 1941 that unnecessary personnel should be eliminated from the Reich government bureaucracy, from private corporations and even from within the non-fighting portion of the Wehrmacht itself, but attempts to achieve this had only managed to generate more red tape.

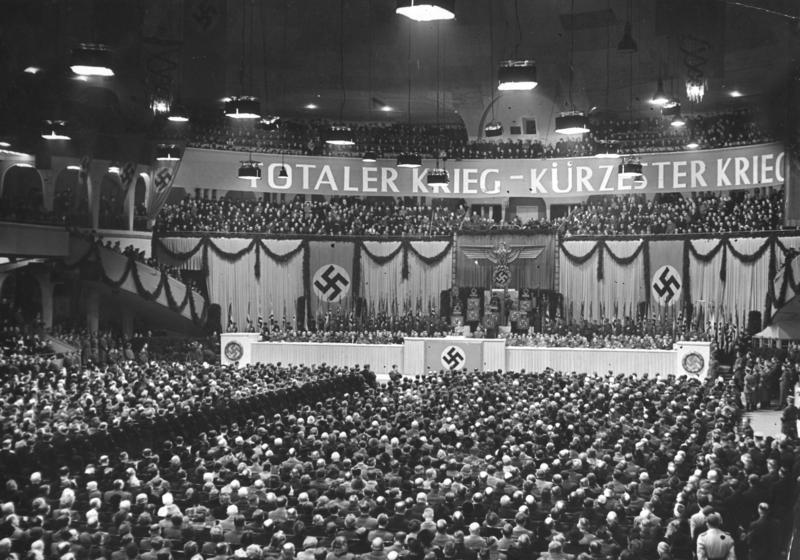
Goebbels speaking at the Berlin Sports Palace on 18 February 1943. On the banner is Totaler Krieg – Kürzester Krieg or "Total War – Shortest War"

As Propaganda Minister, Goebbels understood that pressure could be brought to bear to push these initiatives along by way of a major propaganda campaign. On 18 February 1943, he made a nationally broadcast speech from the Berlin Sportpalast before a hand-picked audience of 14,000 Nazi die-hards, in which he extolled the necessity of a Spartan way of life in order to achieve total war. (Note: Besides carefully-selected party members and officials, there were wounded veterans in the audience. There was also a smattering of token workers, women, intellectuals and scientists, as well as Red Cross nurses accompanying the highly decorated yet wounded military members present.) Throughout the speech the crews filming the event panned in and out on prominent people for added dramatic effect. (Note: One of the figures the camera captured was the actor Heinrich George.) Goebbels roused his audience with rhetorical questions; he was interrupted more than 200 times by shouts, slogans and wildly enthusiastic applause:

Are you and the German people determined, if the Leader orders it, to work ten, twelve, and, if necessary, fourteen and sixteen hours a day and to give your utmost for victory? [Loud shouts of 'Yes!' and lengthy applause] ... I ask you: Do you want total war? [Loud cries of 'Yes!' Loud applause] Do you want it, if necessary, more total and more radical than we can even imagine it today? [Loud cries of 'Yes!' Applause]

One remarkable passage from the speech included Goebbels's ironic description of onrushing Russian invaders that near perfectly described the Nazi operations in the Eastern theater. To this end, Goebbels stated, "Behind the oncoming Soviet Divisions we see the Jewish liquidation commandos, and behind them, terror, and the specter of mass starvation and complete anarchy." He also proclaimed that it was "time to remove the kid gloves and use our fists." After finishing, Goebbels was triumphantly carried shoulder-high from the hall. Millions of people listened on the radio, both live and when the speech was re-broadcast the following Sunday. The speech contained an admonition that all shirkers from the work measures necessary for total war would be subject to the death penalty. One of the reasons the speech had such potency and resonated with the German people was it played on their fears of another military defeat like that of 1918, which they assumed would mean social and political collapse, the "bolshevization" of German society, and it represented the struggle for existence that the regime had so religiously promulgated. The entire text was printed in the newspapers the morning after the speech. The event was later described as "a feat of mass hypnosis." (Note: Later on Goebbels cynically commented that the whole affair was "an hour of idiocy" and that had he instructed the crowd to "jump from the fourth floor of the Columbus House they would have done it.")

Hitler, who had given his general approval of Goebbels' plan in advance, had not known the specifics of what was going to be proposed, but when he read the text of the speech, he fell in behind the plan; however, within the Nazi Party, the speech was seen as a power move by Goebbels and Armaments Minister Albert Speer to displace the Committee of Three, which had accomplished little. Hitler, in his usual manner, preferred to keep his underlings in competition with other, and would not give either Goebbels and Speer or the committee the full authority necessary to achieve the goals that Goebbels saw as necessary, although by Autumn 1943, the Committee of Three—which had concentrated on trivial issues and got caught up in the bureaucratic nightmare of trying to eliminate overlap between the German government and the Nazi Party—had effectively ceased to be a factor. Its last meeting was held in August.

Goebbels continued to pressure Hitler to commit more fully to the total war concept. He met with Hitler on 21 June for three hours, having used Hitler's Wehrmacht adjutant, General Rudolf Schmundt, to lay the groundwork. Before speaking to Hitler, Goebbels met with Speer, who advised him on the severe problem with the supply of fuel caused by American attacks on fuel plants. He also learned that, due to failures of the Luftwaffe to protect German cities from Allied air attacks, Hermann Göring had fallen out of Hitler's favor. This was important to Goebbels, as Göring was a potential rival for control of any total war effort.

In his meeting with Hitler, Goebbels pulled out all the stops, painting the darkest possible picture of the situation, demeaning his possible rivals, such as Göring and Keitel, and making elaborate promises for the benefits of a total war effort, such as a million new soldiers for the Wehrmacht. He offered a Germany teetering on the brink of doom that only total war could save it from, and he averred that the people were behind the changes he proposed: they wanted and expected tough measures in a severe crisis.

Hitler, however, did not think the time was yet ripe for the kinds of measures that Goebbels proposed, and wanted to keep things as they were for the time being. Goebbels reported "The Führer does not regard the crisis so serious and compelling that it could persuade him to pull out all the stops." But Hitler held out the promise that when he did think such measures were necessary, he would give the necessary powers to Goebbels, and nobody else.

== Appointment of Goebbels ==
The factor which, more than anything, changed Hitler's mind about going ahead with total war was the attempt by officers of the Wehrmacht to assassinate him in the July 20 plot. This reinforced his feelings that his generals were undermining his efforts to win the war. This, in Hitler's mind, had led to the steady worsening of the German military position in the East, in the war against the Soviet Union. At about the same time, Goebbels and Speer both sent the Führer lengthy memos about the necessity of total war. All these factors come together to finally convert Hitler to the idea that only a full-out total war effort could turn the tide, and he appointed Goebbels as "Reich Plenipotentiary for Total War" on 23 July 1944; in theory with full authority, thus freezing out both the Committee of Three and Göring, who saw himself as the natural choice for that role, as both a military leader—he was the head of the Luftwaffe—and, at least on paper if no longer in fact, the czar of the German economy as Plenipotentiary in charge of the Four Year Plan. However, the creation of the position of Reich Plenipotentiary for Total War gave Goebbels the power to lead the mobilization effort and made him responsible for maximising both the Wehrmacht's manpower and the armaments industry at the expense of economic sectors considered non-essential to the war effort.

Although the public announcement of the creation of the new office implied that the idea had come from Göring, who was still at the time Chairman of the Ministerial Council for the Defense of the Reich, it was in fact Goebbels' idea, and the decree had been drafted by Lammers. Göring's reaction to not having been appointed to the position was to take to his hunting estate in East Prussia; he refused to visit Hitler at his Wolf's Lair headquarters for weeks. Goebbels, on the other hand, told his staff that he had achieved "practically full dictatorial powers" with the new appointment.

== Modus vivendi ==
While Goebbels' new position had, in theory, extensive authority over both the civilian sector and the Reich government, in actuality his power was limited in certain ways. While he could direct Reich Ministers and other "highest Reich authorit[ies]" to take the actions he deemed necessary, only the ministers and other authorities could actually issue the decrees and ordinances to put these into effect, so if the ministers and authorities did not agree with Goebbels, they could easily drag their feet and, for all practical purposes, stop Goebbels' intended actions from being put into effect. Further, decrees and ordinances issued at Goebbels' direction had to be agreed to by Lammers, Bormann, and Himmler, who was both Interior Minister and Plenipotentiary for Reich Administration. Directives which concerned the Nazi Party had to have the support of Bormann, representing Hitler, and disputes among these various satraps had to go to Hitler via Lammers. Also excluded from Goebbels' direct control were any authorities who reported to Hitler directly, such as Speer in his capacity as the designated re-builder of Berlin, and those responsible for re-building Munich and Linz, as well as the staffs of the three chancelleries: the Reich Chancellery, Presidential Chancellery and Party Chancellery. The Wehrmacht as well was not under Goebbels Plenipotentiary authority.

Notwithstanding the practical limitations on his authority, Goebbels plunged into the total war effort with great energy. He quickly assembled as staff from various ministries, including many from his own Propaganda Ministry, and his new staff of 50 prided itself on its non-bureaucratic approach to putting Goebbels' ideas into effect, improvising when necessary, and making quick decisions. Goebbels contacted the leaders of the Reich and the Nazi Party to persuade them that every action of the agencies and organizations under their control should be measured by how they would be received by front-line soldiers and armaments workers.

On 3 August, at a meeting of all the Nazi Party gauleiters ("regional leaders") in Posen, Goebbels explained that the total war effort was necessary to counter treasonous activity among the leaders of the military which had surfaced with the July 20 plot to kill Hitler. The gauleiters were essential to Goebbels, since he intended to put into effect the sweeping changes he had in mind not through the German government, but by using the machinery of the Nazi Party, which the gauleiters were each in charge of in their areas. For this reason, he allied himself with Martin Bormann, the Party Chancellor and, as Hitler's person secretary, tremendously influential within both the Party and the Reich. The gauleiters cooperated with Goebbels as long as their own powers were not diminished, and Bormann acted as their protector.

Goebbels also needed to ensure Hitler's continued support, and to this effect issued frequent progress bulletins to Hitler (Führer-Informationen) printed in the special type face used so that Hitler could read it without his glasses. The bulletins were carefully written to present Goebbels' successes and recommendations in such a way that Hitler was almost assured of approving them. Despite this, Hitler blocked certain initiatives proposed by Goebbels when they were brought to his attention by Bormann as having a potential negative effect on military and civilian morale.

== Actions taken ==
Goebbels concentrated at first on drafting more men into the armed forces, which brought him into conflict with Speer, who was constantly looking for more labor for the armaments industry. Concerned with output, Speer believed the changes being instituted by Goebbels were presenting "major disruptions" to armaments production. Speer appealed to Hitler, who decided in Goebbels' favor, and Speer was told by Goebbels and Bormann that henceforth he was under their command, and that he was not to make any more personal appeals to Hitler.

As Plenipotentiary for Total War, Goebbels instituted numerous labor cutbacks both within the government and in the private sector, raised the age for women to be drafted into war work from 45 to 55, moved 400,000 women from domestic service to war work, and cut down on the number of men exempt from the draft in reserved occupations, among other measures. However, even though these steps brought more men into the armed forces, it was not sufficient to keep up with the number of soldiers killed, wounded or captured.

Goebbels also attempted to bring control of the newly organized Volkssturm ("People's storm") units into his total war effort, only to be out-maneuvered by Bormann and Himmler, who had come to an agreement with each other to split the responsibility. Hitler signed the decree formalizing the arrangement on 26 September, freezing out Goebbels.

== Effect ==
Ultimately, even though he achieved some of his goals in the short-term, Goebbels' efforts were in vain, for reasons outlined by historian Richard J. Evans:

Germany's economic resources were never adequate to turn [German fantasies of imperial domination of Europe] into reality, not even when the resources of a large part of the rest of Europe were added to them. No amount of "mobilization for total war", no degree of economic rationalization, could alter this fundamental fact of life.

Sharing the assessment made by Evans, historian Michael Burleigh prefaced his discussion of Goebbels and the fanatical pursuit of "Total War" in his work The Third Reich: A New History with a review of the state of German morale caused by negative reports from the front and the relentless Allied bombing campaign, which immediately after the short-lived fever of total war mobilization, was further drained by "military disasters and the persistence of wartime inequalities"; all of which contributed to a progressive isolation of the Nazi leadership. Burleigh also highlights how the "exhortations of heroic death and sacrifice bore scant resemblance" to the German people's mood and that the "population shrank from anything tainted with ideology" but preferred the solace they found in the Church to deal with their loss and grief.

== See also ==
- Four Year Plan
- Sportpalast speech
