= Sportpalast speech =

1943 speech by Joseph Goebbels

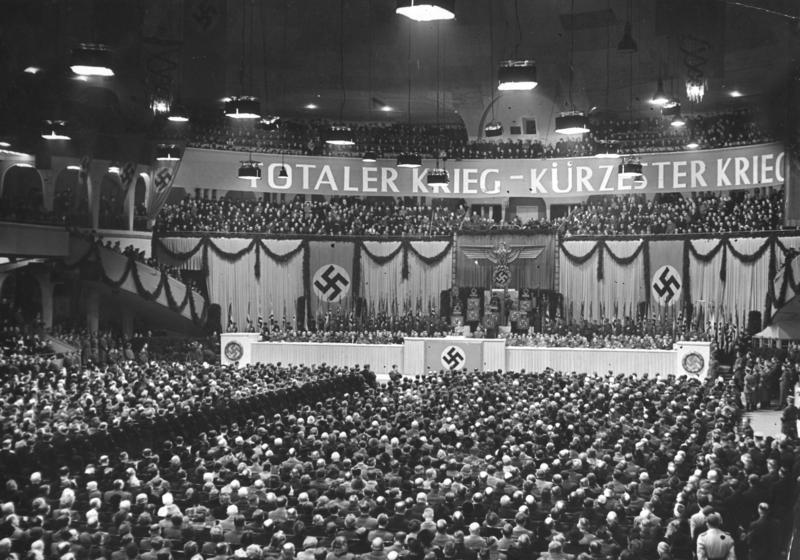
Nazi rally on 18 February 1943 at the Berlin Sportpalast; the sign says "Totaler Krieg – Kürzester Krieg" ("Total War – Shortest War").

Sportpalast speech
Abridged recording of Joseph Goebbels's speech in the Sportpalast in 1943.

The Sportpalast speech (German: Sportpalastrede) or Total War speech was a speech delivered by German Propaganda Minister Joseph Goebbels at the Berlin Sportpalast to a large, carefully selected audience on 18 February 1943, as the tide of World War II was turning against Nazi Germany and its Axis allies. It is considered the most famous of Goebbels's speeches. The speech was the first public admission by the Nazi leadership that Germany faced serious dangers. Goebbels called for a total war (German: totaler Krieg) to secure victory over the Allies, and urged the German people to continue the war even though it would be long and difficult because, as he asserted, both Germany's and Europe's survival were "at stake" from Bolshevism.

== Background ==
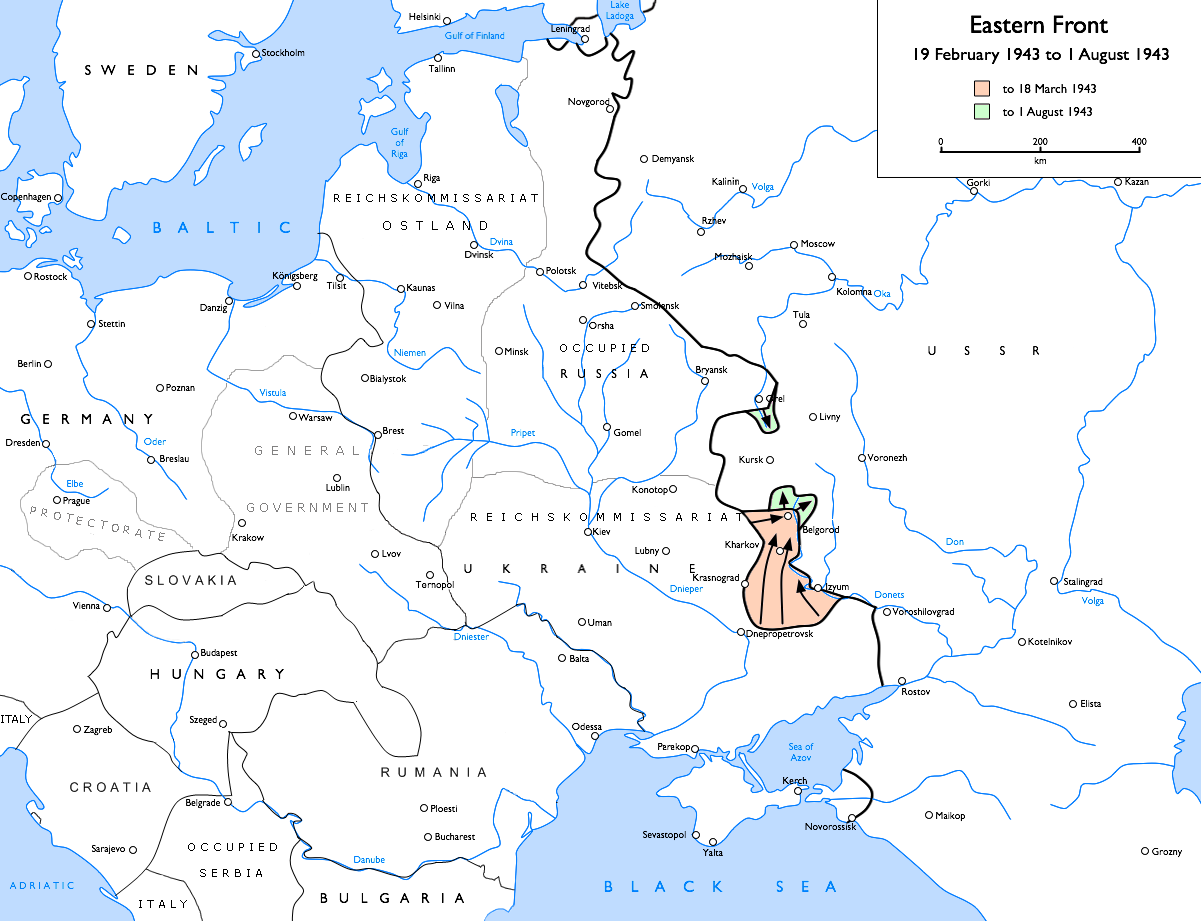
The Eastern Front in February 1943

After the Axis defeat in late 1942 at the Second Battle of El Alamein in Egypt, a turning point of World War II in Europe occurred on 2 February 1943 as the Battle of Stalingrad ended with the surrender of Field Marshal Friedrich Paulus and the German 6th Army to the Soviets. At the Casablanca Conference in January, US President Franklin D. Roosevelt and British Prime Minister Winston Churchill had demanded Germany's unconditional surrender, and the Soviets, encouraged by their victory, were beginning to retake territory, including Kursk (8 February), Rostov-on-Don (14 February), and Kharkov (16 February). After the Axis defeats in Egypt and the subsequent loss of Tripoli (23 January 1943), military setbacks shook Axis morale. In the Pacific, the Americans had just completed their months-long reconquest of Guadalcanal.

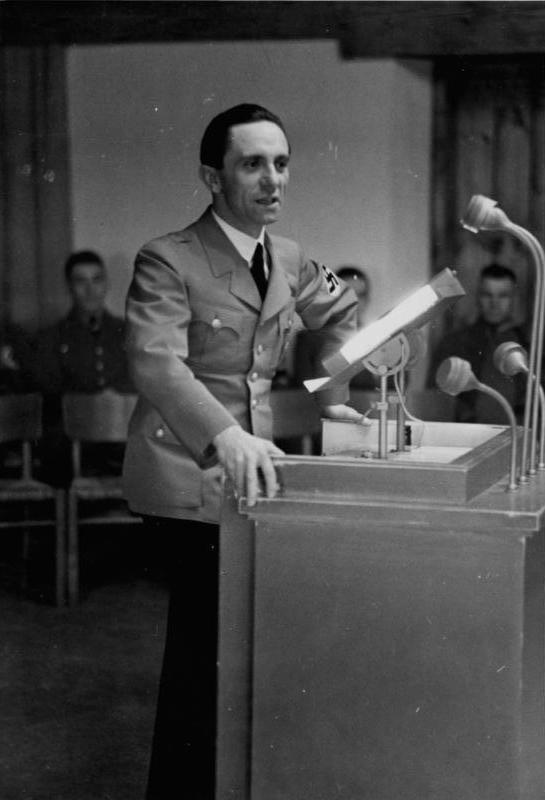
Goebbels, April 1937

Hitler responded with the first measures that would lead to the all-out mobilisation of Germany. Prior to the speech, the government closed restaurants, clubs, bars, theatres, and luxury stores throughout the country so that the civilian population could contribute more to the war. Despite this, the measures taken did not go as far as Goebbels wanted, and other ministers such as Hermann Göring and Hans Lammers succeeded in watering the measures down.

== Setting and audience ==
The setting of the speech in the Sportpalast placed the audience behind and under a big banner bearing the all-capital words "TOTALER KRIEG – KÜRZESTER KRIEG" ("total war – shortest war") along with Nazi banners and swastikas, as seen in pictures and film of the event.

Although Goebbels claimed that the audience included people from "all classes and occupations" (including "soldiers, doctors, scientists, artists, engineers and architects, teachers, white collars"), the propagandist had carefully selected his listeners to react with appropriate fanaticism. Goebbels said to Albert Speer that it was the best-trained audience one could find in Germany. However, the enthusiastic and unified crowd response recorded in the written version is, at times, not fully supported by the recording.

== Details ==
Goebbels reiterated three themes in the speech:

1. If the Wehrmacht was not in a position to counter the danger from the Eastern Front, the German Reich would fall to Bolshevism and the rest of Europe shortly afterwards.
2. The Wehrmacht, the German people, and the Axis Powers alone had the strength to save Europe from this threat.
3. Danger was at hand, and Germany had to act quickly and decisively.

In the speech, Goebbels elaborated at length what Nazi propaganda asserted was the threat posed by so-called International Jewry: "The goal of Bolshevism is Jewish world revolution. They want to bring chaos to the Reich and Europe, using the resulting hopelessness and desperation to establish their international, Bolshevist-concealed, capitalist tyranny." Rejecting the protests of enemy nations against the Reich's Jewish policies, he stated, to deafening chants from the audience, that Germany "intends to take the most radical measures, if necessary, in good time."

While Goebbels referred to Soviet mobilisation nationwide as "devilish", he explained that "we cannot overcome the Bolshevist danger unless we use equivalent, though not identical, methods [in a] total war". He then justified the austerity measures enacted, explaining them as temporary measures.

Historically, the speech is important in that it marks the first admission by the Nazi Party leadership that they were facing problems, and launched the mobilisation campaign that, arguably, prolonged the war, under the slogan: "And storm, break loose!" (Und Sturm, brich los!). Goebbels claimed that no German was thinking of any compromise and instead that "the entire nation is only thinking about a hard war".

Goebbels attempted to counter reports in the Allied press that German civilians had lost faith in victory by asking the audience several questions at the end, such as:

Do you believe with the Führer and us in the final total victory of the German people? Are you and the German people willing to work, if the Führer orders, 10, 12 and if necessary 14 hours a day and to give everything for victory? Do you want total war? If necessary, do you want a war more total and radical than anything that we can even imagine today?

The audio recording of the speech differs in some ways from the written record. Especially significant is that in the recording, Goebbels begins to mention the "extermination" of the Jews, rather than the less harsh terms used in the written version to describe the Final Solution, but catches himself in the middle of the word. In the written version, Goebbels does not mention the Jews in this sentence, referring only to "countermeasures" ("Gegenmaßnahmen").

== Quotes ==
Deutschland jedenfalls hat nicht die Absicht, sich dieser jüdischen Bedrohung zu beugen, sondern vielmehr die, ihr rechtzeitig, wenn nötig unter vollkommen und radikalster Ausr... -schaltung [Ausrottung / Ausschaltung] des Judentums entgegenzutreten.

...

Ich frage euch: Wollt ihr den totalen Krieg?! Wollt ihr ihn, wenn nötig, totaler und radikaler, als wir ihn uns heute überhaupt erst vorstellen können?!

...

Nun, Volk, steh auf, und Sturm, brich los!

Translation:

"Germany, in any case, has no intention of bowing to this Jewish threat, but rather one of confronting it in due time, if need be in terms of complete and most radical exterm... exclusion [lit. 'cutoff'] of Jewry.

...

"I ask you: Do you want total war?! Do you want it, if necessary, more total and radical than anything that we can yet today even conceive?!

...

"Now [emph.], people, rise up, and storm, break loose!"

The last line originated in the poem Männer und Buben (Men and Boys) by Carl Theodor Körner during the Napoleonic Wars. Körner's words had been quoted by Hitler in his 1920 speech "What We Want" delivered at Munich's Hofbräuhaus, but also by Goebbels himself in older speeches, including his 6 July 1932 campaign speech before the Nazis took power in Germany.

Regarding the word Ausschaltung there was a slight pause when Goebbels said Aussr...., Ausschaltung means 'elimination', which fits the context of the speech.

== Reception ==
Millions of Germans listened to Goebbels on the radio as he delivered this speech about the "misfortune of the past weeks" and an "unvarnished picture of the situation." By amassing such popular enthusiasm, Goebbels wanted to convince Hitler to give him greater powers in running the war economy. Hitler, however, was not yet ready to bring the economy to a total war footing over the objections of his other ministers. On 23 July 1944, Goebbels was finally appointed Reich Plenipotentiary for Total War, responsible for maximising the manpower for the Wehrmacht and the armaments industry at the expense of sectors of the economy not essential to the war effort.

The speech also led to the spread of a late-war whisper joke, popular in Western Germany, especially the Ruhr:

Lieber Tommy fliege weiter,
wir sind alle Bergarbeiter.
Fliege weiter nach Berlin,
da ham’ se alle Ja geschrien.

Translation:

Dear Tommy, fly further
we're all mine-workers here.
Fly further to Berlin
there they've all screamed Yes.
