= Berlin Sportpalast =

Demolished indoor arena in Germany

Coordinates: 52°29′41″N 13°21′33″E

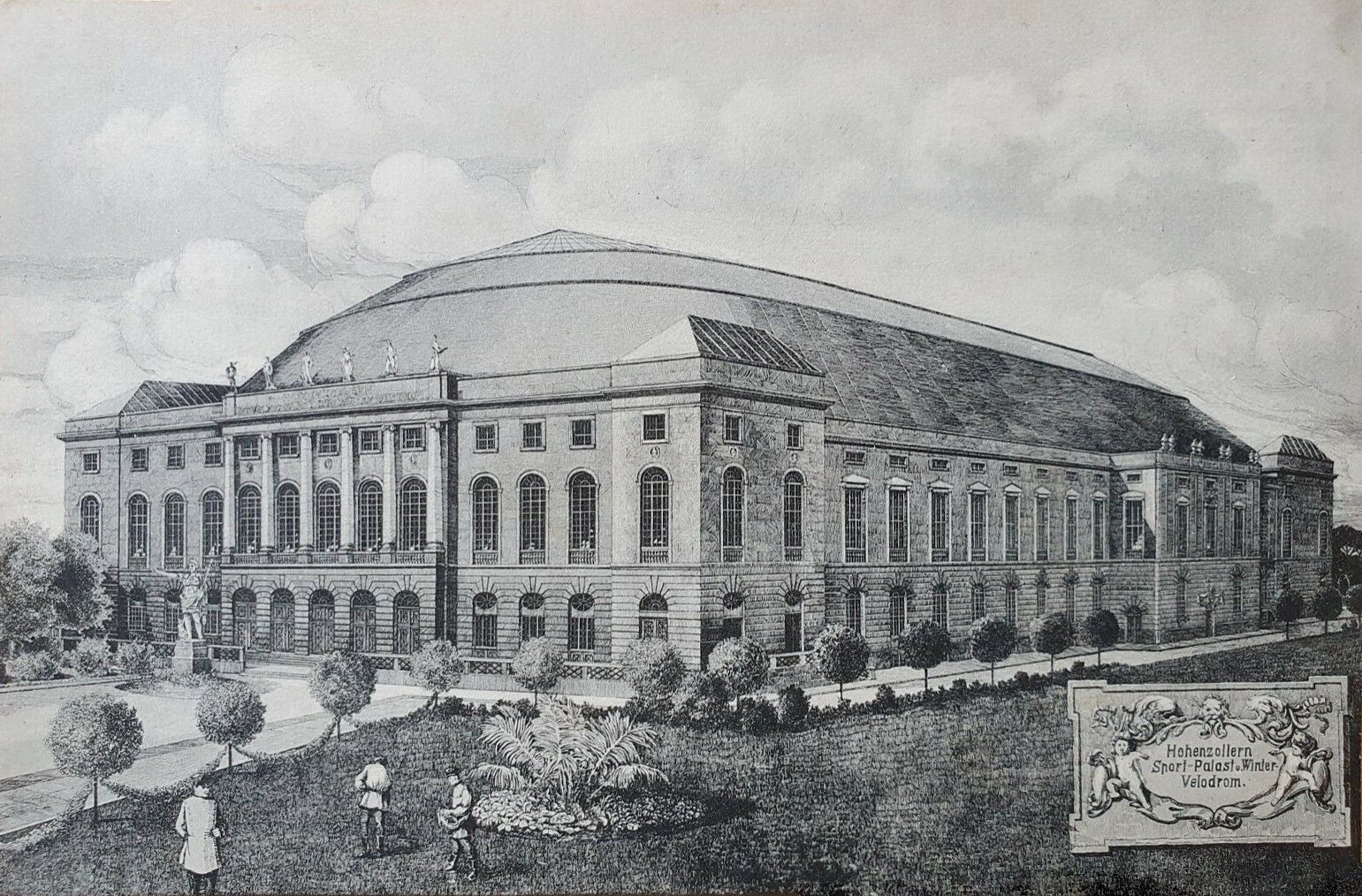
Postcard depiction of new Sportpalast, 1910.

Berlin Sportpalast (German: [ˈʃpɔɐ̯tpaˌlast]; built 1910, demolished 1973) was a multi-purpose indoor arena located in the Schöneberg section of Berlin, Germany. Depending on the type of event and seating configuration, the Sportpalast could hold up to 14,000 people and was for a time the biggest meeting hall in Berlin. The Sportpalast is most known for speeches and rallies that took place during Nazi Germany, particularly Propaganda Minister Joseph Goebbels's 1943 "Total War" speech.

== Early years ==
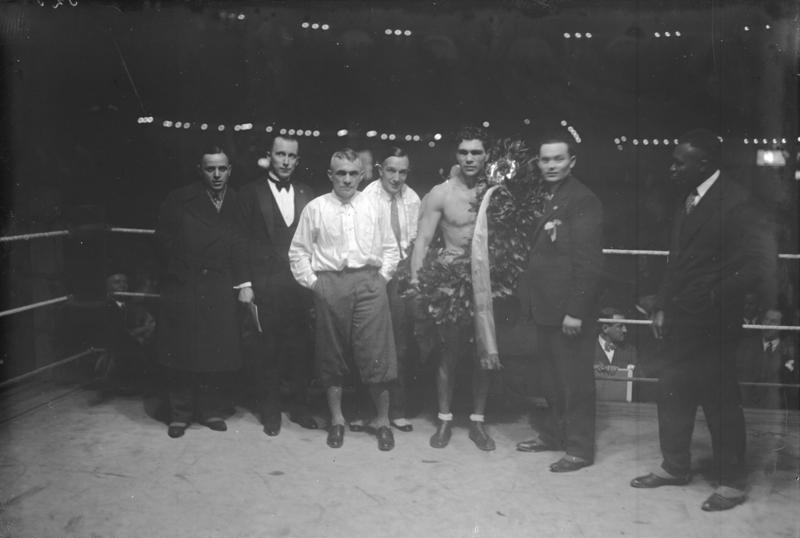
Max Schmeling at Sportpalast, 1928.

Built at Potsdamer Straße 172, principally as an indoor ice rink for ice hockey and skating events, the Sportpalast was a sensation at the time of its opening in November 1910, and was at the time the largest such enclosed skating facility in the world. In later years, the Sportpalast also hosted non-winter sporting events such as six-day bicycle races and professional boxing matches in which well-known German boxer Max Schmeling fought. The Sportpalast was also used as a meeting hall for a variety of events, including political rallies and the Bockbierfest (Bock beer festival) with Bavarian bands, dancing, and roasted meat.

During the tumultuous years of the Weimar Republic in the 1920s and early 1930s, the Sportpalast was used for the mass meetings of the major German political parties; within its walls, speakers from the Social Democrats, Communists and National Socialists outlined their programs and strategies to capacity crowds.

== Nazi era ==
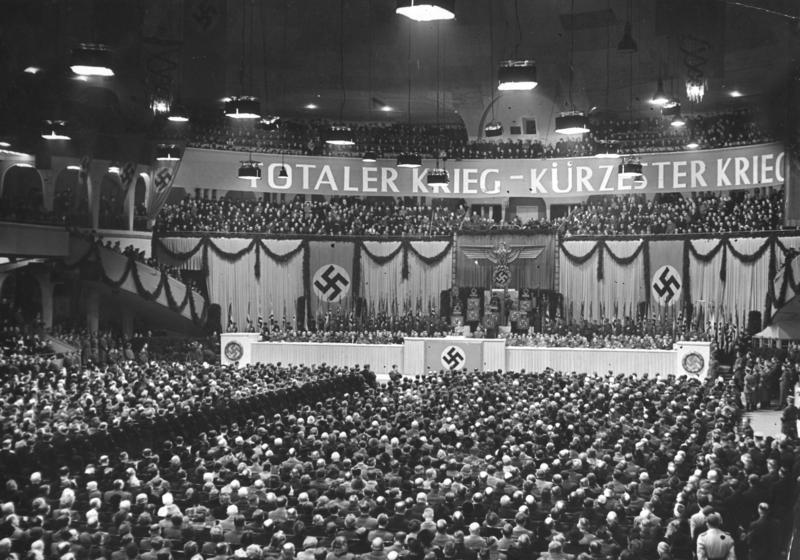
Goebbels' Total War speech, early 1943. The banner says "Total war - shortest war."

Even after the Nazi Party gained power in 1933 and outlawed the other German political parties, the Sportpalast continued to be a popular venue for party rallies and important speeches by party leaders, including Adolf Hitler and Goebbels. Because of the size and propaganda potential of the Sportpalast, Goebbels is said to have labeled the hall as Unsere große politische Tribüne — "our big political grandstand".

In 1937 it was the site of an assassination attempt on Adolf Hitler by an unknown person in an SS uniform.

The Sportpalast was the site of Hitler's Winterhilfe address of September 4, 1940, in which he announced a shift to bombing of British cities rather than only military targets, heralding the beginning of the London Blitz. But the most significant of many Nazi speeches and rallies at the Sportpalast was Goebbels's Total War speech on February 18, 1943 – two weeks after the disastrous German defeat in the Battle of Stalingrad. In his fanatical appeal to "totaler Krieg" before a select Nazi audience, Goebbels sought to rally the German people to heightened support for the war, which had begun to turn against Germany and was producing ever-growing casualty lists.

== Postwar years ==
At war's end in 1945, the Sportpalast was in badly damaged condition with its roof destroyed. The building did not reopen for public ice sports until 1951, but those events were not popular because the rink was open to the elements and thus too cold for spectators to enjoy. A new roof was constructed later, with the building reopening in 1953. Among the notables who performed at the Sportpalast in its postwar years was the world-famous figure skater Sonja Henie.

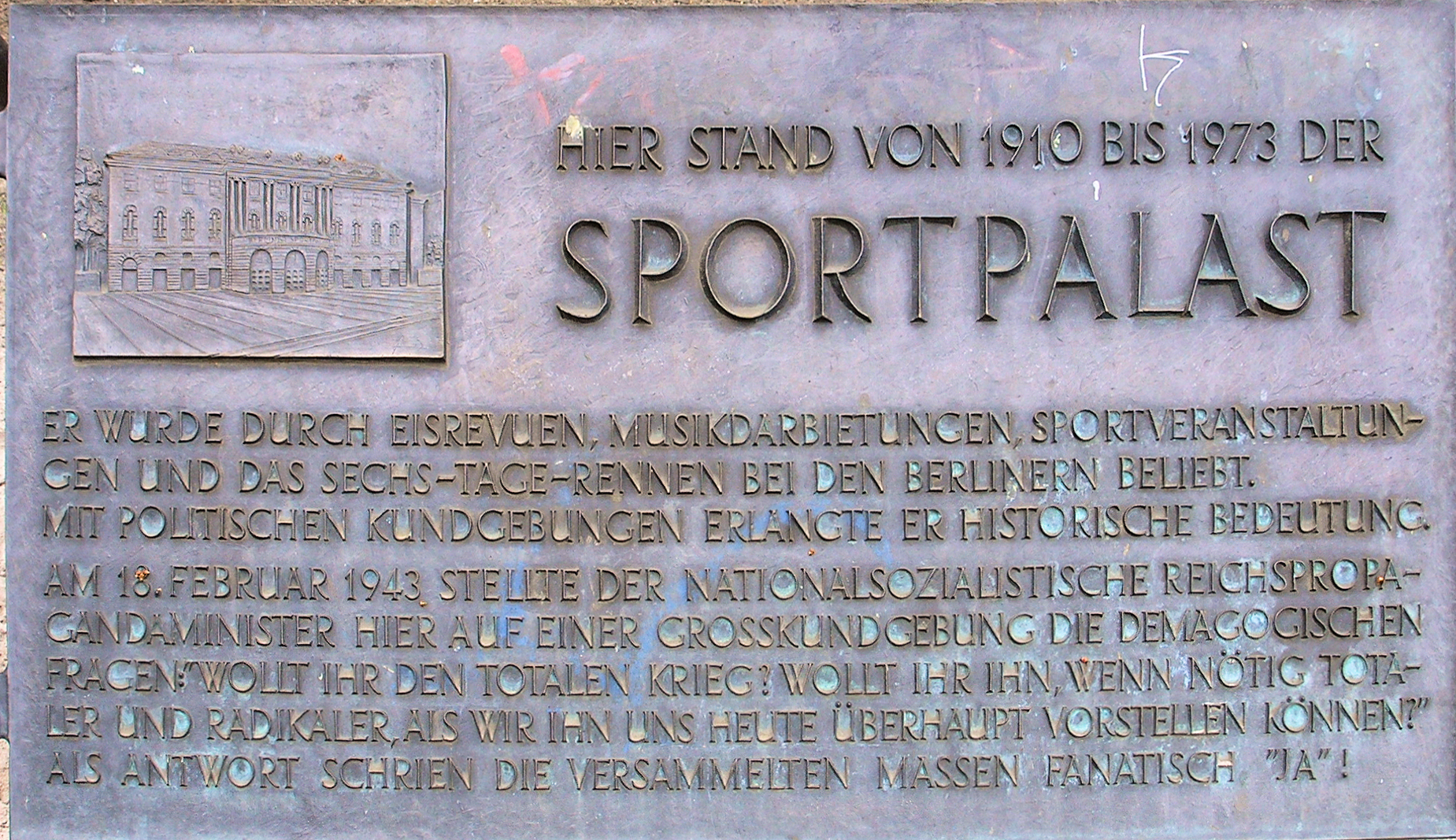
Historical marker, Berlin-Schöneberg

In the early 1950s, the banker Heinz Henschel attempted to revive the Sportpalast, which he had played in as a member of the Berliner Schlittschuhclub.

With the division of the city between East and West in the Cold War, the Sportpalast was in West Berlin. Although it was no longer the city's preeminent meeting hall, the Sportpalast in the postwar years hosted varied sorts of events, including rock concerts. Artists such as Bill Haley, Louis Armstrong, Mahalia Jackson, The Beach Boys, Jimi Hendrix, Pink Floyd, Deep Purple, The Nice, and The Mothers of Invention performed at the Sportpalast during the building's final decades.

By the 1970s, the operation of the hall was no longer profitable. The Sportpalast closed in 1973 and was torn down and replaced by a high-rise apartment complex, dubbed the "Sozialpalast" – "the social (housing) palace".
