= Joseph Goebbels =

German Nazi propaganda minister (1897–1945)

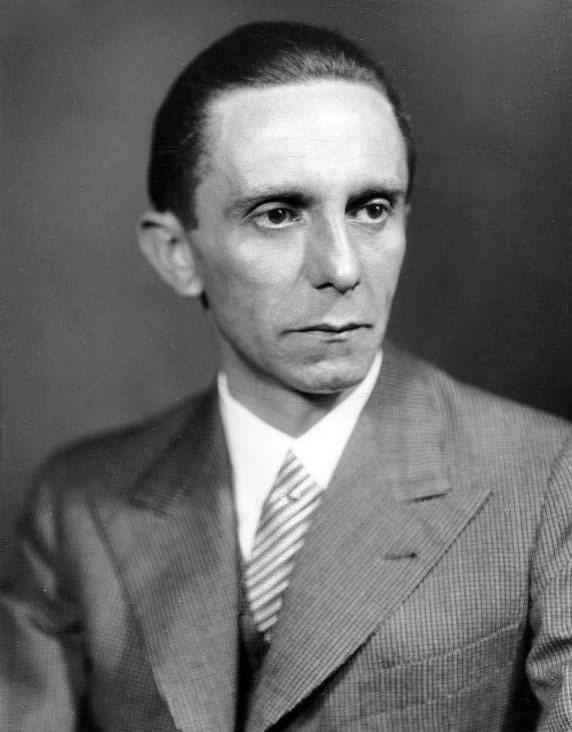
- Goebbels in 1933

Chancellor of Germany
- In office 30 April 1945 – 1 May 1945
- President: Karl Dönitz
- Preceded by: Adolf Hitler
- Succeeded by: Lutz Schwerin von Krosigk (as Leading Minister)^{[1]}

Stadtpräsident of Berlin
- In office 7 April 1944 – 1 May 1945
- Lord Mayor: Ludwig Steeg
- Preceded by: Ludwig Steeg
- Succeeded by: Office abolished

Reichsminister of Public Enlightenment and Propaganda
- In office 13 March 1933 – 30 April 1945
- Chancellor: Adolf Hitler
- Preceded by: Office established
- Succeeded by: Werner Naumann

Gauleiter of Berlin
- In office 26 October 1926 – 1 May 1945
- Führer: Adolf Hitler
- Preceded by: Ernst Schlange
- Succeeded by: Office abolished

Additional positions
- 1944–1945: Commander of the Volkssturm in Gau Berlin
- 1944–1945: Reich Plenipotentiary for Total War
- 1933–1945: Reichsleiter of the National Socialist German Workers' Party
- 1933–1945: Member of the Greater German Reichstag
- 1928–1933: Member of the Reichstag

Personal details
- Born: Paul Joseph Goebbels; 29 October 1897 Rheydt, Rhine Province, German Empire
- Died: 1 May 1945 (aged 47) Berlin, Germany
- Cause of death: Cyanide poisoning or gunshot wound (suicide)
- Party: Nazi Party (from 1924)
- Spouse: Magda Ritschel (m. 1931)
- Children: 6
- Education: University of Bonn; University of Würzburg; University of Freiburg; Ludwig-Maximilians-Universität München; Heidelberg University (PhD)
- Occupation: Propagandist; politician; philologist
- Goebbels' voice Sportpalast speech Recorded 18 February 1943
- Formally titled "Leading Minister" or "Chief Minister" (Leitender Minister)

Paul Joseph Goebbels (Note: German: [ˈpaʊ̯l ˈjoːzɛf ˈɡœbl̩s], /ˈɡɚbl̩z/, US also /ˈɡoʊbl̩z/) (29 October 1897 – 1 May 1945) was a German politician and philologist who was the Gauleiter (district leader) of Berlin, chief propagandist for the Nazi Party, and then Reich Minister of Propaganda from 1933 until his suicide in 1945. He was one of Adolf Hitler's closest and most devoted followers and was known for his skills in public speaking and his extreme antisemitism which was evident in his publicly voiced views. He advocated progressively harsher discrimination, including the extermination of Jews and other groups in the Holocaust.

Born in Rheydt, Goebbels aspired to be an author and obtained a doctorate in philology from the University of Heidelberg in 1922. He joined the Nazi Party in 1924 and worked with Gregor Strasser in its northern branch. He was appointed Gauleiter of Berlin in 1926, where he began to take an interest in the use of propaganda to promote the party and its programme. After the Nazis came to power in 1933, Goebbels' Propaganda Ministry quickly gained control over the news, media, arts, and flow of information in Nazi Germany. He was particularly adept at using the relatively new media of radio and film for propaganda purposes. Topics for party propaganda included antisemitism, attacks on Christian churches, and (after the start of the Second World War) attempts to shape troop and civilian morale.

In 1943, Goebbels began to pressure Hitler to introduce measures that would produce "total war", including closing businesses not essential to the war effort, conscripting women into the labour force, and enlisting men in previously exempt occupations into the Wehrmacht. Hitler finally appointed him as Reich Plenipotentiary for Total War on 23 July 1944, whereby Goebbels undertook largely unsuccessful measures to increase the number of people available for armaments manufacture and the Wehrmacht.

As the war drew to a close and Germany faced defeat, Goebbels' wife Magda, along with the couple's children, joined Hitler in Berlin. On 22 April 1945, they moved into the Vorbunker, part of Hitler's underground bunker complex. Hitler committed suicide on 30 April. In accordance with Hitler's will, Goebbels succeeded him as Chancellor of Germany; he served one day in this post. On the following day, Goebbels and Magda committed suicide, having poisoned their six children with a cyanide compound.

== Early life, education, and relationships ==
Paul Joseph Goebbels was born on 29 October 1897 in Rheydt, an industrial town south of Mönchengladbach near Düsseldorf, Germany. Both of his parents were Catholics with modest family backgrounds. His father, Fritz, was a German factory clerk; his mother, Katharina Maria (née Odenhausen), was born to Dutch and German parents in a Dutch village close to the border with Germany. Goebbels had five siblings: Konrad (1893–1949), Hans (1895–1947), Maria (1896–1896), Elisabeth (1901–1915) and Maria (1910–1949), who married the German filmmaker Max W. Kimmich in 1938. In 1932 Goebbels commissioned the publication of a pamphlet of his family tree to refute the rumours that his maternal grandmother was of Jewish ancestry.

During childhood Goebbels experienced ill health, which included a long bout of inflammation of the lungs. He had a deformed right foot, which turned inwards due to a congenital disorder or an infection in the bone. It was thicker and shorter than his left foot. Just prior to starting grammar school he underwent an operation, which failed to correct the problem. Goebbels wore a metal brace and a special shoe because of his shortened leg and walked with a limp. He was rejected for military service in World War I because of this condition.

Goebbels was educated at a Gymnasium, where he completed his Abitur (university entrance examination) in 1917. He was the top student of his class and was given the traditional honour of speaking at the awards ceremony. His parents initially hoped that he would become a Catholic priest, which Goebbels seriously considered. He studied literature and history at the University of Bonn, the University of Würzburg, the University of Freiburg, and the Ludwig-Maximilians-Universität München, aided by a scholarship from the Albertus Magnus Society. By this time, Goebbels had begun to distance himself from the church.

Historians, including Richard J. Evans and Roger Manvell, speculate that Goebbels' lifelong pursuit of women may have been in compensation for his physical disability. In Freiburg he met and fell in love with Anka Stalherm, who was three years his senior. She went on to Würzburg to continue studying, as did Goebbels. By 1920, the relationship with Anka was over; the break-up filled Goebbels with thoughts of suicide. (Note: Among Goebbels' school papers offered for auction in 2012 were more than 100 love letters written between Goebbels and Stalherm. The Telegraph 2012.) In 1921, he wrote a semi-autobiographical novel, Michael, a three-part work of which only Parts I and III have survived. Goebbels felt that he was writing his "own story". Antisemitic content and material about a charismatic leader may have been added by Goebbels shortly before the book was published in 1929 by Eher-Verlag, the publishing house of the Nazi Party.

At Heidelberg University, Goebbels wrote his doctoral thesis on Wilhelm von Schütz, a minor 19th-century romantic dramatist. He had hoped to write his thesis under the supervision of Friedrich Gundolf, a literary historian. It did not seem to bother Goebbels that Gundolf was Jewish. As he was no longer teaching, Gundolf directed Goebbels to associate professor Max Freiherr von Waldberg. Waldberg, who was also Jewish, recommended Goebbels write his thesis on Wilhelm von Schütz. After submitting the thesis and passing his oral examination, Goebbels received his PhD on 21 April 1922. By 1940 he had written 14 books.

Goebbels returned home and worked as a private tutor. He also found work as a journalist and was published in the local newspaper. His writing during that time reflected his growing antisemitism and dislike for modern culture. In the summer of 1922 he met and began a love affair with Else Janke, a schoolteacher. After she revealed to him that she was half-Jewish, Goebbels stated the "enchantment [was] ruined." Nevertheless he continued to see her on and off until 1927.

He continued for several years to try to become a published author. His diaries, which he began in 1923 and continued for the rest of his life, provided an outlet for his desire to write. The lack of income from his literary works – he wrote two plays in 1923, neither of which sold – forced him to take employment as a caller on the stock exchange and as a bank clerk in Cologne, a job he detested. He was dismissed from the bank in August 1923 and returned to Rheydt. During this period he read avidly and was influenced by the works of Oswald Spengler, Fyodor Dostoyevsky and Houston Stewart Chamberlain, the British-born German writer whose book The Foundations of the Nineteenth Century (1899) was one of the standard works of the extreme right in Germany. He also began to study the social question and read the works of Karl Marx, Friedrich Engels, Rosa Luxemburg, August Bebel and Gustav Noske. According to German historian Peter Longerich, Goebbels' diary entries from late 1923 to early 1924 reflected the writings of a man who was isolated, preoccupied with "religious-philosophical" issues and lacked a sense of direction. Diary entries from mid-December 1923 onwards show that Goebbels was moving towards the Völkisch nationalist movement.

== Nazi activist ==
Goebbels first took an interest in Adolf Hitler and Nazism in 1924. In February 1924, Hitler's trial for treason began in the wake of his failed attempt to seize power in the Beer Hall Putsch of 8–9 November 1923. The trial attracted widespread press coverage and gave Hitler a platform for propaganda. Hitler was sentenced to five years in prison, but was released on 20 December 1924, after serving just over a year, including pre-trial detention. Goebbels was drawn to the Nazi Party mostly because of Hitler's charisma and commitment to his beliefs. He joined the Nazi Party around this time, becoming member number 8762. In late 1924, Goebbels offered his services to Karl Kaufmann, who was Gauleiter (Nazi Party district leader) for the Rhine-Ruhr District. Kaufmann put him in touch with Gregor Strasser, a leading Nazi organiser in northern Germany, who hired him for their weekly newspaper and to undertake secretarial duties for the regional party offices. He was also put to work as party speaker and representative for Rhineland-Westphalia. Strasser founded the National Socialist Working Association on 10 September 1925, a short-lived group of about a dozen northern and western German Gauleiter; Goebbels became its business manager and the editor of its biweekly journal, NS-Briefe. Members of Strasser's northern branch of the Nazi Party, including Goebbels, had a more socialist outlook than the rival Hitler group in Munich. Strasser disagreed with Hitler on many parts of the party platform, and in November 1926 began working on a revision.

Hitler viewed Strasser's actions as a threat to his authority, and in February 1926 summoned 60 Gauleiters and party leaders, including Goebbels, to a special conference in Bamberg, in Streicher's Gau of Franconia, where he gave a two-hour speech repudiating Strasser's new political programme. Hitler was opposed to the socialist leanings of the northern wing, stating it would mean "political bolshevization of Germany." Further, there would be "no princes, only Germans," and a legal system with no "Jewish system of exploitation ... for plundering of our people." The future would be secured by acquiring land, not through expropriation of the estates of the former nobility, but through colonising territories to the east. Goebbels was horrified by Hitler's characterisation of socialism as "a Jewish creation" and his assertion that a Nazi government would not expropriate private property. He wrote in his diary: "I no longer fully believe in Hitler. That's the terrible thing: my inner support has been taken away."

After reading Hitler's book Mein Kampf, Goebbels found himself agreeing with Hitler's assertion of a "Jewish doctrine of Marxism". In February 1926, Goebbels gave a speech titled "Bolshevism or National-socialism? Lenin or Hitler?" in which he asserted that communism or Marxism could not save the German people, but he believed it would cause a "socialist nationalist state" to arise in Russia. Also in 1926, Goebbels published a pamphlet titled Nazi-Sozi which attempted to explain how National Socialism differed from Marxism.

In hopes of winning over the opposition, Hitler arranged meetings in Munich with the three Greater Ruhr Gau leaders, including Goebbels. Goebbels was impressed when Hitler sent his own car to meet them at the railway station. That evening, Hitler and Goebbels both gave speeches at a beer hall rally. The following day, Hitler offered his hand in reconciliation to the three men, encouraging them to put their differences behind them. Goebbels capitulated completely, offering Hitler his total loyalty. He wrote in his diary: "I love him ... He has thought through everything," "Such a sparkling mind can be my leader. I bow to the greater one, the political genius." He later wrote: "Adolf Hitler, I love you because you are both great and simple at the same time. What one calls a genius." As a result of the Bamberg and Munich meetings, the National Socialist Working Association was disbanded. Strasser's new draft of the party programme was discarded, the original National Socialist Program of 1920 was retained unchanged, and Hitler's position as party leader was greatly strengthened.

== Propagandist in Berlin ==
At Hitler's invitation, Goebbels spoke at party meetings in Munich and at the annual Party Congress, held in Weimar in 1926. For the following year's event, Goebbels was involved in the planning for the first time. He and Hitler arranged for the rally to be filmed. Receiving praise for doing well at these events led Goebbels to shape his political ideas to match Hitler's, and to admire and idolise him even more.

=== Gauleiter ===
Goebbels was first offered the position of party Gauleiter for the Berlin section in August 1926. He travelled to Berlin in mid-September and by the middle of October accepted the position. Thus Hitler's plan to divide and dissolve the northwestern Gauleiters group that Goebbels had served in under Strasser was successful. Hitler gave Goebbels great authority over the area, allowing him to determine the course for organisation and leadership for the Gau. Goebbels was given control over the local Sturmabteilung (SA) and Schutzstaffel (SS) and answered only to Hitler. The party membership numbered about 1,000 when Goebbels arrived, and he reduced it to a core of 600 of the most active and promising members. To raise money, he instituted membership fees and began charging admission to party meetings. Aware of the value of publicity (both positive and negative), he deliberately provoked beer-hall battles and street brawls, including violent attacks on the Communist Party of Germany (KPD). Goebbels adapted recent developments in commercial advertising to the political sphere, including the use of catchy slogans and subliminal cues. His new ideas for poster design included using large type, red ink, and cryptic headers that encouraged the reader to examine the fine print to determine the meaning.

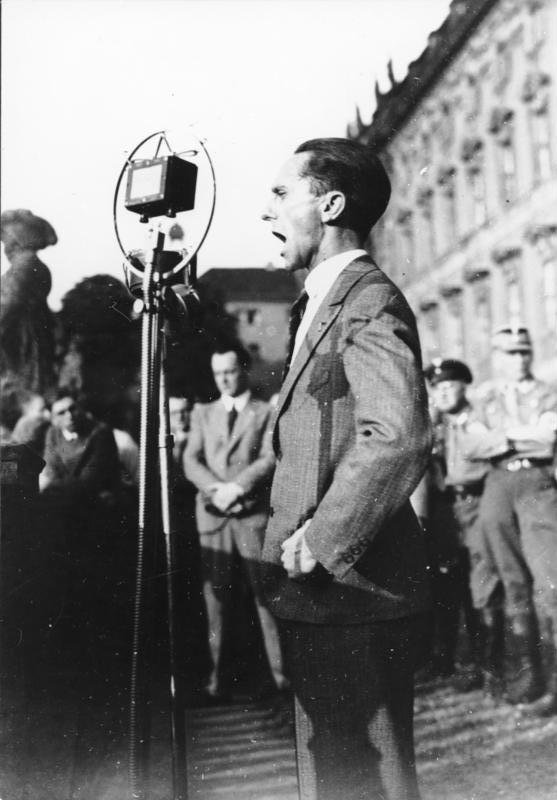
Goebbels speaks at a political rally (1932). This body position, with arms akimbo, was intended to show the speaker as being in a position of authority.

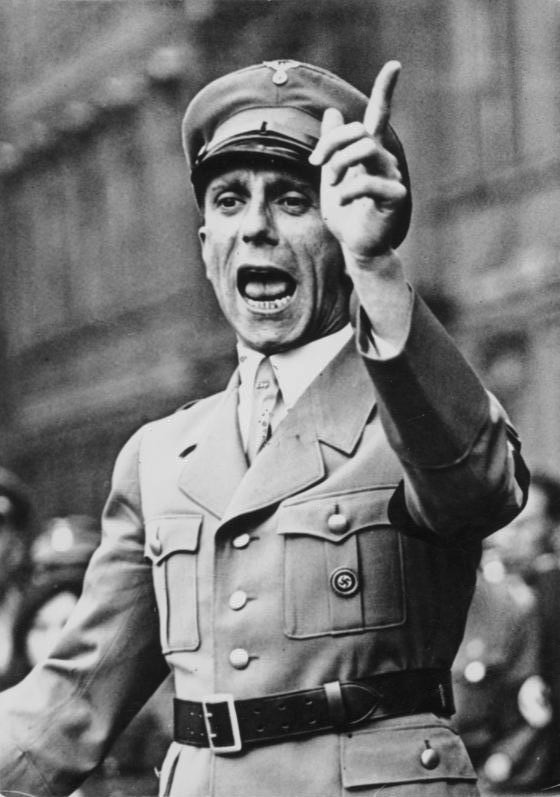
Goebbels giving a speech in Lustgarten, Berlin, August 1934. This hand gesture was used while delivering a warning or threat.

Like Hitler, Goebbels practised his public speaking skills in front of a mirror. Meetings were preceded by ceremonial marches and singing, and the venues were adorned with party banners. His entrance, which was almost always late, was timed for maximum emotional impact. Goebbels usually meticulously planned his speeches in advance, employing pre-planned and choreographed inflections and gestures. However, he was also able to improvise and adapt his presentation to establish a strong connection with his audience. He used loudspeakers, decorative flames, uniforms, and marches to attract attention to speeches.

Goebbels' tactic of using provocation to bring attention to the Nazi Party, along with violence at the public party meetings and demonstrations, led the Berlin police to ban the Nazi Party from the city on 5 May 1927. Violent incidents continued, including young Nazis randomly attacking Jews in the streets. Goebbels was subjected to a public speaking ban until the end of October. During this period, he founded the newspaper Der Angriff (The Attack) as a propaganda vehicle for the Berlin area, where few supported the party. It was a modern-style newspaper with an aggressive tone; 126 libel suits were pending against Goebbels at one point. To his disappointment, circulation was initially only 2,000. Material in the paper was highly anti-communist and antisemitic. Among the paper's favourite targets was the Jewish Deputy Chief of the Berlin Police Bernhard Weiß. Goebbels gave him the derogatory nickname "Isidore" and subjected him to a relentless campaign of Jew-baiting in the hope of provoking a crackdown he could then exploit. Goebbels continued to try to break into the literary world, with a revised version of his book Michael finally being published, and the unsuccessful production of two of his plays (Der Wanderer and Die Saat (The Seed)). The latter was his final attempt at playwriting. During this period in Berlin he had relationships with many women, including his old flame Anka Stalherm, who was now married and had a small child. He was quick to fall in love, but easily tired of a relationship and moved on to someone new. He worried too about how a committed personal relationship might interfere with his career.

=== 1928 election ===
The ban on the Nazi Party was lifted before the Reichstag elections on 20 May 1928. The Nazi Party lost nearly 100,000 voters and earned only 2.6 per cent of the vote nationwide. Results in Berlin were even worse, where they attained only 1.4 per cent of the vote. Goebbels was one of the first 12 Nazi Party members to gain election to the Reichstag. This gave him immunity from prosecution for a long list of outstanding charges, including a three-week jail sentence he received in April for insulting the deputy police chief Weiß. The Reichstag changed the immunity regulations in February 1931, and Goebbels was forced to pay fines for libellous material he had placed in Der Angriff over the course of the previous year. Goebbels continued to be elected to the Reichstag at every subsequent election during the Weimar and Nazi regimes.

In his newspaper Berliner Arbeiterzeitung (Berlin Workers Newspaper), Gregor Strasser was highly critical of Goebbels' failure to attract the urban vote. However, the party as a whole did much better in rural areas, attracting as much as 18 per cent of the vote in some regions. This was partly because Hitler had publicly stated just prior to the election that Point 17 of the party programme, which mandated the expropriation of land without compensation, would apply only to Jewish speculators and not private landholders. After the election, the party refocused their efforts to try to attract still more votes in the agricultural sector. In May, shortly after the election, Hitler considered appointing Goebbels as party propaganda chief. But he hesitated, as he worried that the removal of Gregor Strasser from the post would lead to a split in the party. Goebbels considered himself well suited to the position, and began to formulate ideas about how propaganda could be used in schools and the media.

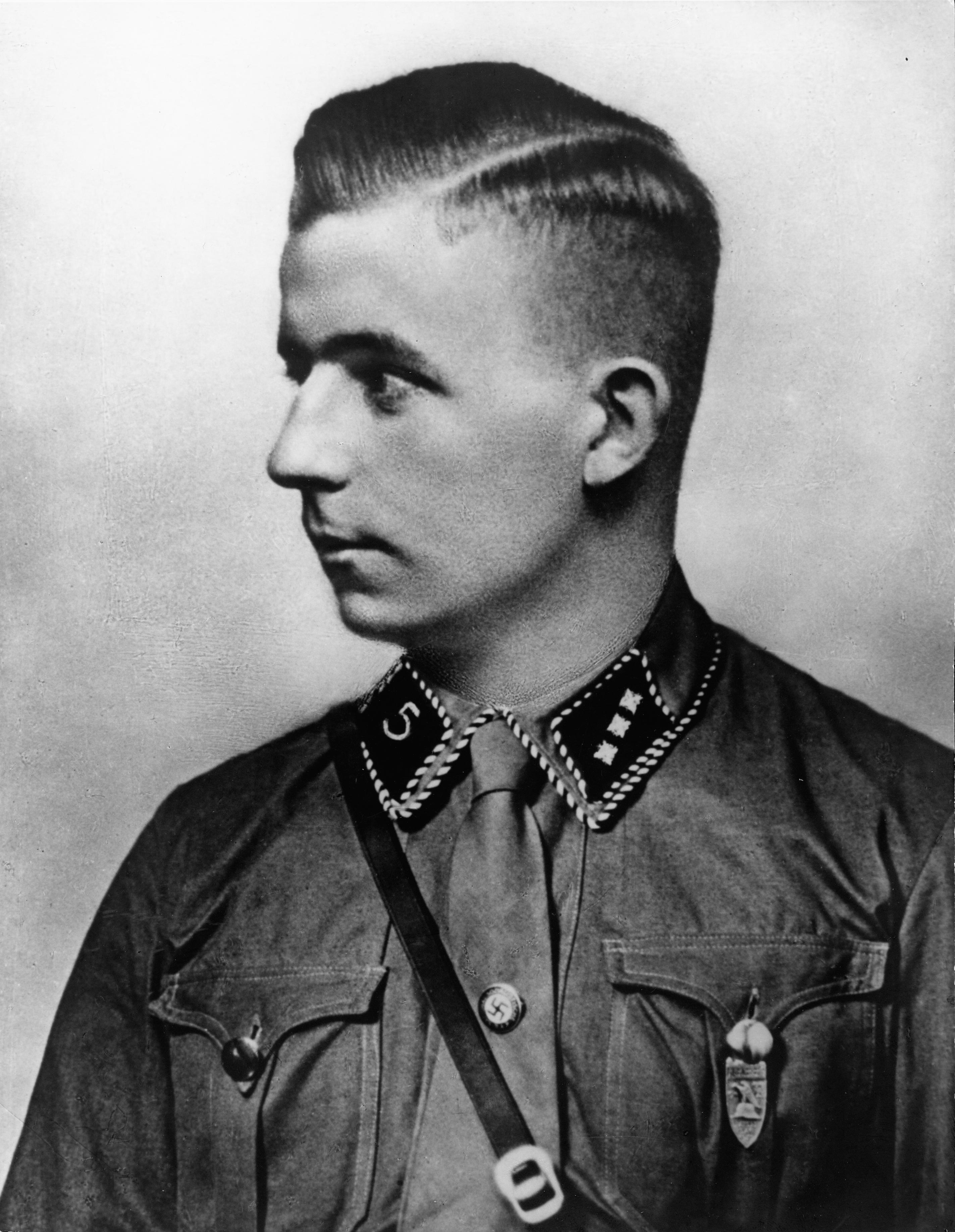
Goebbels used the death of Horst Wessel (pictured) in 1930 as a propaganda tool against "Communist subhumans".

By 1930 Berlin was the party's second-strongest base of support after Munich. That year the violence between the Nazis and communists led to local SA troop leader Horst Wessel being shot by two members of the KPD. He later died in hospital. Exploiting Wessel's death, Goebbels turned him into a martyr for the Nazi movement. He officially declared Wessel's march Die Fahne hoch (Raise the flag), renamed as the Horst-Wessel-Lied, to be the Nazi Party anthem.

=== Great Depression ===
The Great Depression greatly impacted Germany and by 1930 there was a dramatic increase in unemployment. During this time, the Strasser brothers started publishing a new daily newspaper in Berlin, the Nationaler Sozialist. Like their other publications, it conveyed the brothers' own brand of Nazism, including nationalism, anti-capitalism, social reform, and anti-Westernism. Goebbels complained vehemently about the rival Strasser newspapers to Hitler and admitted that their success was causing his own Berlin newspapers to be "pushed to the wall". In late April 1930, Hitler publicly and firmly announced his opposition to Gregor Strasser and appointed Goebbels to replace him as Reich leader of Nazi Party propaganda. One of Goebbels' first acts was to ban the evening edition of the Nationaler Sozialist. Goebbels was also given control of other Nazi papers across the country, including the party's national newspaper, the Völkischer Beobachter (People's Observer). He still had to wait until 3 July for Otto Strasser and his supporters to announce they were leaving the Nazi Party. Upon receiving the news, Goebbels was relieved the "crisis" with the Strassers was finally over and glad that Otto Strasser had lost all power.

The rapid deterioration of the economy led to the resignation on 27 March 1930 of the coalition government that had been elected in 1928. Paul von Hindenburg appointed Heinrich Brüning as chancellor. A new cabinet was formed, and Hindenburg used his power as president to govern via emergency decrees. Goebbels took charge of the Nazi Party's national campaign for Reichstag elections called for 14 September 1930. Campaigning was undertaken on a huge scale, with thousands of meetings and speeches held all over the country. Hitler's speeches focused on blaming the country's economic woes on the Weimar Republic, particularly its adherence to the terms of the Treaty of Versailles, which required war reparations that had proven devastating to the German economy. He proposed a new German society based on race and national unity. The resulting success took even Hitler and Goebbels by surprise: the party received 6.5 million votes nationwide and took 107 seats in the Reichstag, making it the second-largest party in the country.

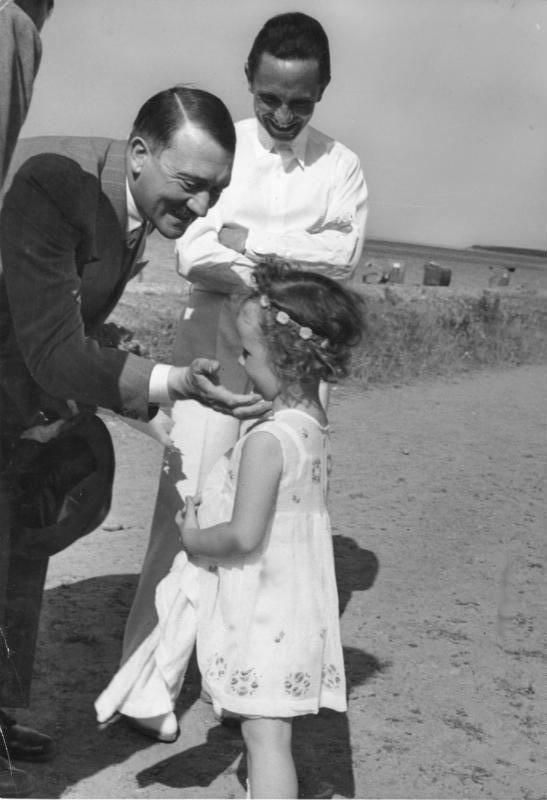
Goebbels and his daughter Helga with Adolf Hitler in Heiligendamm

In late 1930 Goebbels met Magda Quandt, a divorcée who had joined the party a few months earlier. She worked as a volunteer in the party offices in Berlin, helping Goebbels organise his private papers. Her flat on Reichskanzlerplatz soon became a favourite meeting place for Hitler and other Nazi Party officials. Goebbels and Quandt married on 19 December 1931 at a Protestant church. Hitler was his best man.

At the 24 April 1932 Prussian state election, Goebbels won a seat in the Landtag of Prussia. For the two Reichstag elections held in 1932, Goebbels organised massive campaigns that included rallies, parades, speeches, and Hitler travelling around the country by aeroplane with the slogan "the Führer over Germany". Goebbels wrote in his diary that the Nazis must gain power and exterminate Marxism. He undertook numerous speaking tours during these election campaigns and had some of their speeches published on gramophone records and as pamphlets. Goebbels was also involved in the production of a small collection of silent films that could be shown at party meetings, though they did not yet have enough equipment to widely use this medium. Many of Goebbels' campaign posters used violent imagery such as a giant half-clad male destroying political opponents or other perceived enemies such as "International High Finance". His propaganda characterised the opposition as "November criminals", "Jewish wire-pullers", or a communist threat.

== Role in Hitler's government ==
Support for the party continued to grow, but neither of these elections led to a majority government. In an effort to stabilise the country and improve economic conditions, Hindenburg appointed Hitler as Reich chancellor on 30 January 1933.

To celebrate Hitler's appointment as chancellor, Goebbels organised a torchlight parade in Berlin on the night of 30 January of an estimated 60,000 men, many in the uniforms of the SA and SS. The spectacle was covered by a live state radio broadcast, with commentary by longtime party member and future Minister of Aviation Hermann Göring. Goebbels was disappointed not to be given a post in Hitler's new cabinet. Bernhard Rust was appointed as Minister of Culture, the post that Goebbels was expecting to receive. Like other Nazi Party officials, Goebbels had to deal with Hitler's leadership style of giving contradictory orders to his subordinates, while placing them into positions where their duties and responsibilities overlapped. In this way, Hitler fostered distrust, competition, and infighting among his subordinates to consolidate and maximise his own power. The Nazi Party took advantage of the Reichstag fire of 27 February 1933, with Hindenburg passing the Reichstag Fire Decree the following day at Hitler's urging. This was the first of several pieces of legislation that dismantled democracy in Germany and put a totalitarian dictatorship—headed by Hitler—in its place. On 5 March, yet another Reichstag election took place, the last to be held before the defeat of the Nazis at the end of the Second World War. While the Nazi Party increased their number of seats and percentage of the vote, it was not the landslide expected by the party leadership. Goebbels received Hitler's appointment to the cabinet, becoming head of the newly created Reich Ministry of Public Enlightenment and Propaganda in March 1933.

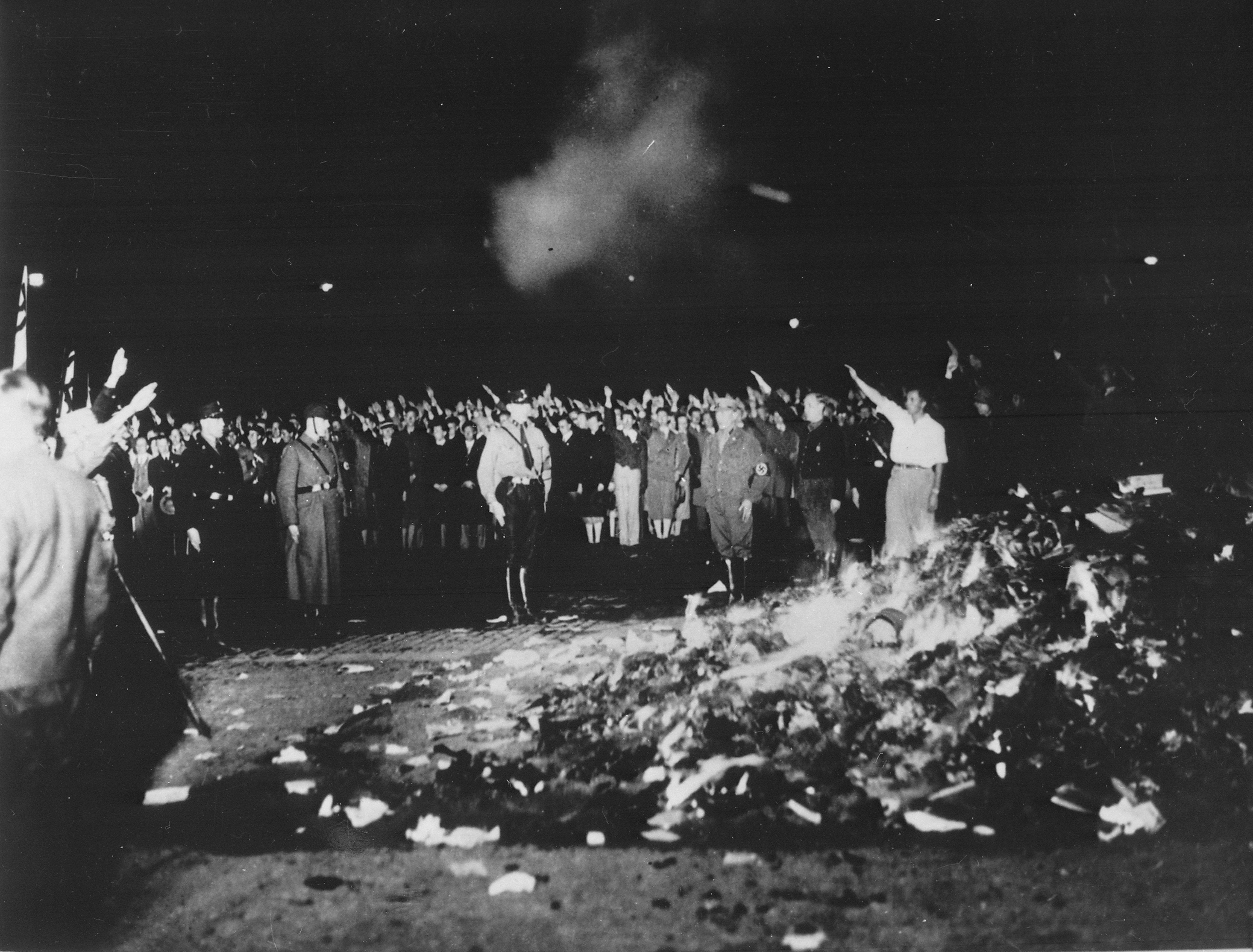
Nazi book burning in Berlin, 10 May 1933

The role of the new ministry, which set up its offices in the 18th-century Ordenspalais across from the Reich Chancellery, was to centralise Nazi control of all aspects of German cultural and intellectual life. On 25 March 1933, Goebbels said that he hoped to increase popular support of the party from the 37 per cent achieved at the last free election held in Germany to 100 per cent support. An unstated goal was to present to other nations the impression that the Nazi Party had the full and enthusiastic backing of the entire population. One of Goebbels' first productions was staging the Day of Potsdam, a ceremonial passing of power from Hindenburg to Hitler, held in Potsdam on 21 March. He composed the text of Hitler's decree authorising the Nazi boycott of Jewish businesses, held on 1 April. Later that month, Goebbels travelled back to Rheydt, where he was given a triumphal reception. The townsfolk lined the main street, which had been renamed in his honour. On the following day, Goebbels was declared a local hero.

Goebbels converted the 1 May holiday from a celebration of workers' rights (observed as such especially by the communists) into a day celebrating the Nazi Party. In place of the usual ad hoc labour celebrations, he organised a huge party rally held at Tempelhof Field in Berlin. The following day, all trade union offices in the country were forcibly disbanded by the SA and SS, and the Nazi-run German Labour Front was created to take their place. "We are the masters of Germany," he commented in his diary entry of 3 May. Less than two weeks later, he gave a speech at the Nazi book burning in Berlin on 10 May, a ceremony he suggested.

Meanwhile, the Nazi Party began passing laws to marginalise Jews and remove them from German society. The Law for the Restoration of the Professional Civil Service, passed on 7 April 1933, forced all non-Aryans to retire from the legal profession and civil service. Similar legislation soon deprived Jewish members of other professions of their right to practise. The first Nazi concentration camps (initially created to house political dissenters) were founded shortly after Hitler seized power. In a process termed Gleichschaltung (coordination), the Nazi Party proceeded to rapidly bring all aspects of life under control of the party. All civilian organisations, including agricultural groups, volunteer organisations, and sports clubs, had their leadership replaced with Nazi sympathisers or party members. By June 1933, virtually the only organisations not in the control of the Nazi Party were the army and the churches. On 2 June 1933, Hitler appointed Goebbels a Reichsleiter, the second highest political rank in the Nazi Party. On 3 October 1933, on the formation of the Academy for German Law, Goebbels was made a member and given a seat on its executive committee. In a move to manipulate Germany's middle class and shape popular opinion, the regime passed on 4 October 1933 the Schriftleitergesetz (Editor's Law), which became the cornerstone of the Nazi Party's control of the popular press. Modelled to some extent on the system in Benito Mussolini's Fascist Italy, the law defined a Schriftleiter as anyone who wrote, edited, or selected texts and illustrated material for serial publication. Individuals selected for this position were chosen based on experiential, educational, and racial criteria. The law required journalists to "regulate their work in accordance with National Socialism as a philosophy of life and as a conception of government."

In 1934, Goebbels published Vom Kaiserhof zur Reichskanzlei (lit. 'From the Kaiserhof to the Reich Chancellery'), his account of Hitler's seizure of power, which he based on his diary from 1 January 1932 to 1 May 1933. The book sought to glorify both Hitler and the author. It sold around 660,000 copies, making it Goebbels' best-selling publication during his lifetime. An English translation was published in 1935 under the title My Part in Germany's Fight.

At the end of June 1934, top officials of the SA and opponents of the regime, including Gregor Strasser, were arrested and killed in a purge later called the Night of Long Knives. Goebbels was present at the arrest of SA leader Ernst Röhm in Munich. On 2 August 1934, President von Hindenburg died. In a radio broadcast, Goebbels announced that the offices of president and chancellor had been combined, and Hitler had been formally named as Führer und Reichskanzler (leader and chancellor).

=== Workings of the Ministry ===
The propaganda ministry was organised into seven departments: administration and legal; mass rallies, public health, youth, and race; radio; national and foreign press; films and film censorship; art, music, and theatre; and protection against counter-propaganda, both foreign and domestic. Goebbels' style of leadership was tempestuous and unpredictable. He would suddenly change direction and shift his support between senior associates; he was a difficult boss and liked to berate his staff in public. Goebbels was successful at his job, however; Life wrote in 1938 that "[p]ersonally he likes nobody, is liked by nobody, and runs the most efficient Nazi department." John Gunther wrote in 1940 that Goebbels "is the cleverest of all the Nazis", but could not succeed Hitler because "everybody hates him".

The Reich Film Chamber, which all members of the film industry were required to join, was created in June 1933. Goebbels promoted the development of films with a Nazi slant, and ones that contained subliminal or overt propaganda messages. Under the auspices of the Reichskulturkammer (Reich Chamber of Culture), created in September, Goebbels added additional sub-chambers for the fields of broadcasting, fine arts, literature, music, the press, and the theatre. As in the film industry, anyone wishing to pursue a career in these fields had to be a member of the corresponding chamber. In this way anyone whose views were contrary to the regime could be excluded from working in their chosen field and thus silenced. In addition, journalists (now considered employees of the state) were required to prove Aryan descent back to the year 1800, and if married, the same requirement applied to the spouse. Members of any chamber were not allowed to leave the country for their work without prior permission of their chamber. A committee was established to censor books, and works could not be re-published unless they were on the list of approved works. Similar regulations applied to other fine arts and entertainment; even cabaret performances were censored. Many German artists and intellectuals left Germany in the pre-war years rather than work under these restrictions.

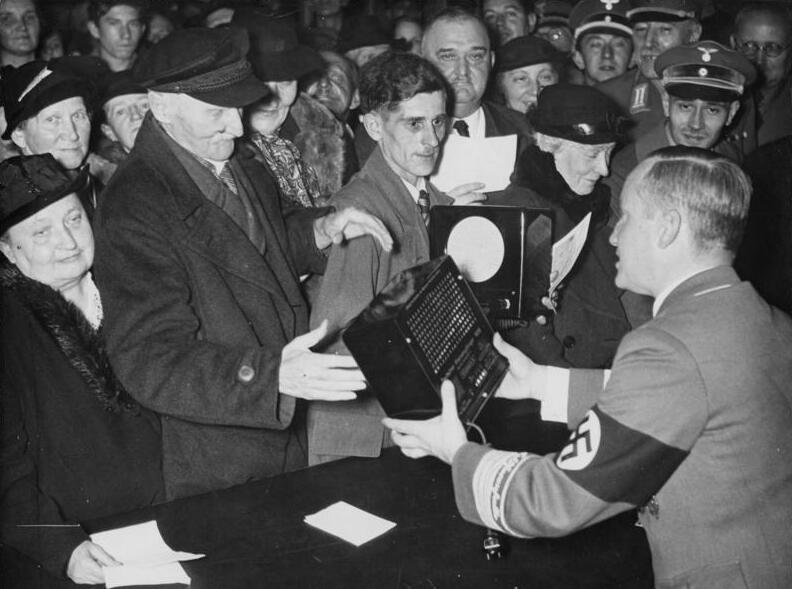
Free radios were distributed in Berlin on Goebbels' birthday in 1938.

Goebbels was particularly interested in controlling the radio, which was then still a fairly new mass medium. Sometimes under protest from individual states (particularly Prussia, headed by Göring), Goebbels gained control of radio stations nationwide, and placed them under the Reichs-Rundfunk-Gesellschaft (German National Broadcasting Corporation) in July 1934. Manufacturers were urged by Goebbels to produce inexpensive home receivers, called Volksempfänger (people's receiver), and by 1938 nearly ten million sets had been sold. Loudspeakers were placed in public areas, factories, and schools, so that important party broadcasts would be heard live by nearly all Germans. On 2 September 1939 (the day after the start of the war), Goebbels and the Council of Ministers proclaimed it illegal to listen to foreign radio stations. Disseminating news from foreign broadcasts could result in the death penalty. Albert Speer, Hitler's architect and later Minister for Armaments and War Production, later said the regime "made the complete use of all technical means for domination of its own country. Through technical devices like the radio and loudspeaker, 80 million people were deprived of independent thought."

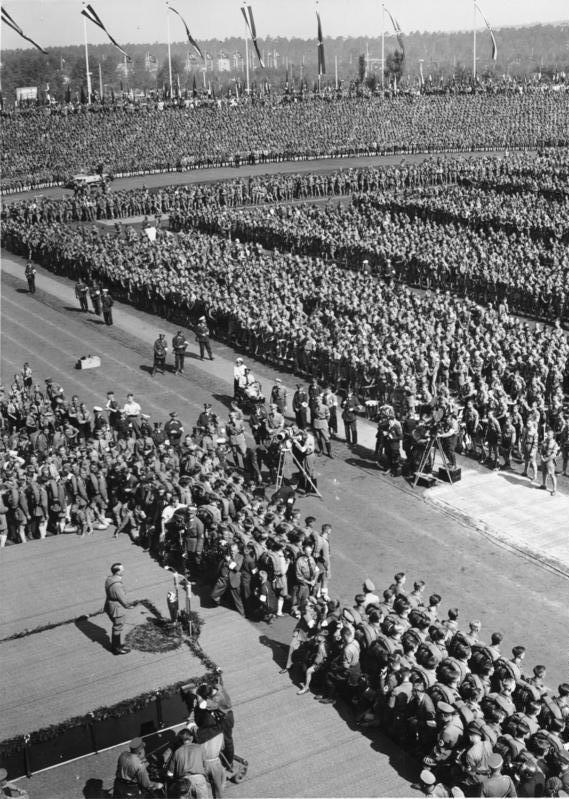
Hitler was the focal point at the 1934 Nuremberg Rally. Leni Riefenstahl and her crew are visible in front of the podium.

A major focus of Nazi propaganda was Hitler himself, who was glorified as a heroic and infallible leader and became the focus of a cult of personality. Much of this was spontaneous, but some was stage-managed as part of Goebbels' propaganda work. Adulation of Hitler was the focus of the 1934 Nuremberg Rally, where his moves were carefully choreographed. The rally was the subject of the film Triumph of the Will, one of several Nazi propaganda films directed by Leni Riefenstahl. It won the gold medal at the 1935 Venice Film Festival. At the 1935 Nazi party congress rally at Nuremberg, Goebbels declared that "Bolshevism is the declaration of war by Jewish-led international subhumans against culture itself."

Goebbels was involved in planning the staging of the 1936 Summer Olympics, held in Berlin. It was around this time that he met and started having an affair with the actress Lída Baarová, whom he continued to see until 1938. A major project in 1937 was the Degenerate Art Exhibition, organised by Goebbels, which ran in Munich from July to November. The exhibition proved wildly popular, attracting over two million visitors. A degenerate music exhibition took place the following year. Meanwhile, Goebbels was disappointed by the lack of quality in the National Socialist artwork, films, and literature.

=== Church struggle ===
In 1933, Hitler signed the Reichskonkordat (Reich Concordat), a treaty with the Vatican that required the regime to honour the independence of Catholic institutions and prohibited clergy from involvement in politics. However, the regime continued to target the Christian churches to weaken their influence. Throughout 1935 and 1936, hundreds of clergy and nuns were arrested, often on trumped up charges of currency smuggling or sexual offences. Goebbels widely publicised the trials in his propaganda campaigns, showing the cases in the worst possible light. Restrictions were placed on public meetings, and Catholic publications faced censorship. Catholic schools were required to reduce religious instruction and crucifixes were removed from state buildings. (Note: Hitler later removed the restriction on crucifixes, as it was damaging morale. Rees & Kershaw 2012.)

Hitler often vacillated on whether or not the Kirchenkampf (church struggle) should be a priority, but his frequent inflammatory comments on the issue were enough to convince Goebbels to intensify his work on the issue; in February 1937, Goebbels stated he wanted to eliminate the Protestant church.

In response to the persecution of the Catholic Church, Pope Pius XI had the "Mit brennender Sorge" ("With Burning Concern") encyclical smuggled into Germany for Passion Sunday 1937 and read from every pulpit. It denounced the systematic hostility of the regime toward the church. In response, Goebbels renewed the regime's crackdown and propaganda against Catholics. His speech of 28 May in Berlin in front of 20,000 party members, which was also broadcast on the radio, attacked the Catholic Church as morally corrupt. As a result of the propaganda campaign, enrolment in denominational schools dropped sharply, and by 1939 all such schools were disbanded or converted to public facilities. Harassment and threats of imprisonment led the clergy to be much more cautious in their criticism of the regime. Partly out of foreign policy concerns, Hitler ordered a scaling back of the church struggle by the end of July 1937.

=== Antisemitism and the Holocaust ===
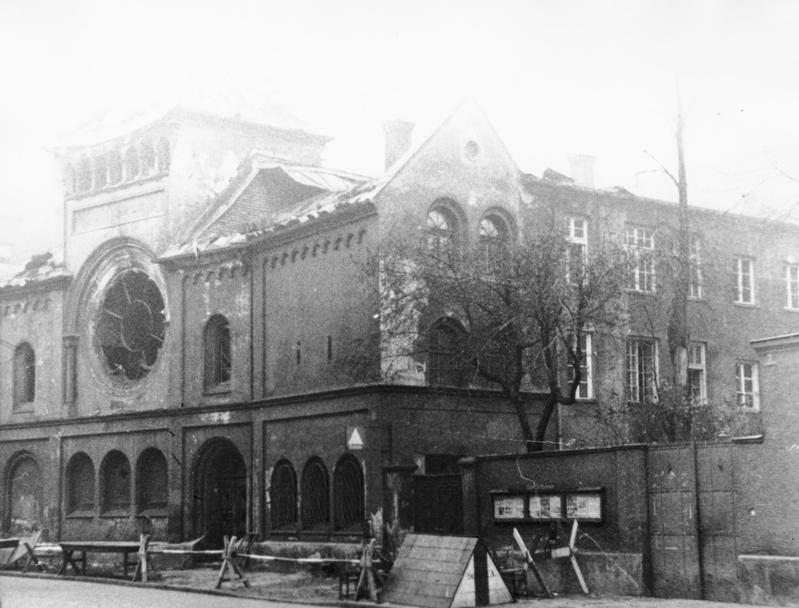
Old Synagogue Ohel Jakob, Munich, after Kristallnacht

Goebbels was antisemitic from a young age. After joining the Nazi Party and meeting Hitler, his antisemitism grew and became more radical. He began to see the Jews as a destructive force with a negative impact on German society. In 1930, he criticised Italian Fascist dictator Benito Mussolini for his relative lack of hostility towards Jews, stating that "Mussolini appears to have not recognized the Jewish question." After the Nazis seized control, he repeatedly urged Hitler to take action against the Jews. Despite his extreme antisemitism, Goebbels spoke of the "rubbish of race-materialism" and of the unnecessity of biological racism for the Nazi ideology. He also described Himmler's ideology as "in many regards, mad" and thought Alfred Rosenberg's racial theories were ridiculous.

The Nazi Party's goal was to remove Jews from German cultural and economic life, and eventually to remove them from the country altogether. In addition to his propaganda efforts, Goebbels actively promoted the persecution of the Jews through pogroms, legislation, and other actions. Discriminatory measures he instituted in Berlin in the early years of the regime included bans against their using public transport and requiring that Jewish shops be marked as such.

In November 1938, the German diplomat Ernst vom Rath was killed in Paris by the young Jewish man Herschel Grynszpan. In response, Goebbels arranged for inflammatory antisemitic material to be released by the press, and the result was the start of a pogrom. Jews were attacked and synagogues destroyed all over Germany. The situation was further inflamed by a speech Goebbels gave at a party meeting on the night of 8 November, where he obliquely called for party members to incite further violence against Jews while making it appear to be a spontaneous series of acts by the German people. At least a hundred Jews were killed, several hundred synagogues were damaged or destroyed, and thousands of Jewish shops were vandalised in an event called Kristallnacht (Night of Broken Glass). Around 30,000 Jewish men were sent to concentration camps. The destruction stopped after a conference held on 12 November, where Göring pointed out that the destruction of Jewish property was in effect the destruction of German property since the intention was that it would all eventually be confiscated.

Goebbels continued his intensive antisemitic propaganda campaign that culminated in Hitler's 30 January 1939 Reichstag speech, which Goebbels helped to write:

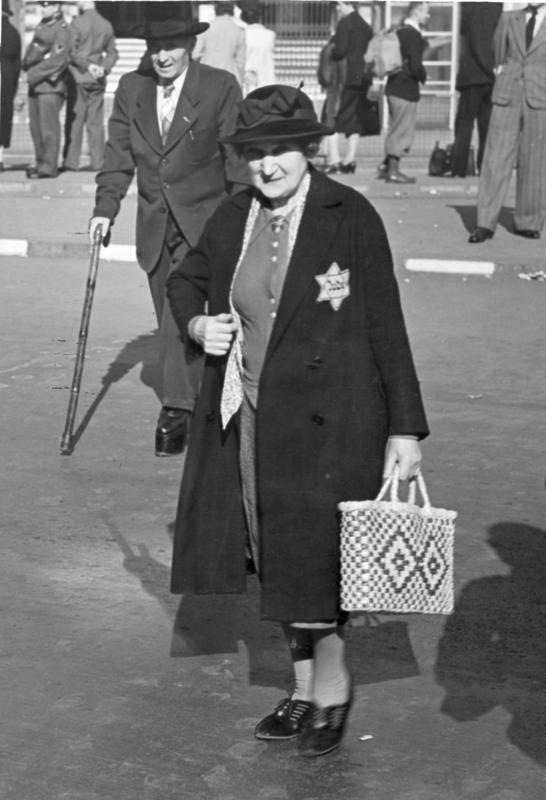
Woman in Berlin wearing the yellow star

If international finance Jewry in and outside Europe should succeed in plunging the nations once more into a world war, then the result will not be the Bolshevization of the earth and thereby the victory of Jewry, but the annihilation of the Jewish race in Europe!

While Goebbels had been pressing for expulsion of the Berlin Jews since 1935, there were still 62,000 living in the city in 1940. Part of the delay in their deportation was that they were needed as workers in the armaments industry. Deportations of German Jews began in October 1941, with the first transport from Berlin leaving on 18 October. Some Jews were shot immediately on arrival in destinations such as Riga and Kaunas. In preparation for the deportations, Goebbels ordered that all German Jews wear an identifying yellow badge as of 5 September 1941. On 6 March 1942, Goebbels received a copy of the minutes of the Wannsee Conference, which indicated indirectly that the Jewish population of Europe was to be sent to extermination camps in occupied areas of Poland and killed. His diary entries of the period show that he was well aware of the fate of the Jews. "In general, it can probably be established that 60 per cent of them will have to be liquidated, while only 40 per cent can be put to work. ... A judgment is being carried out on the Jews which is barbaric but thoroughly deserved," he wrote on 27 March 1942.

Goebbels had frequent discussions with Hitler about the fate of the Jews, a subject they discussed almost every time they met. He was aware throughout that the Jews were being exterminated, and completely supported this decision. He was one of the few top Nazi officials to do so publicly.

== World War II ==
As early as February 1933, Hitler announced that rearmament must be undertaken, albeit clandestinely at first, as to do so was in violation of the Versailles Treaty. A year later he told his military leaders that 1942 was the target date for going to war in the east. Goebbels was one of the most enthusiastic supporters of Hitler aggressively pursuing Germany's expansionist policies sooner rather than later. At the time of the Reoccupation of the Rhineland in 1936, Goebbels summed up his general attitude in his diary: "[N]ow is the time for action. Fortune favors the brave! He who dares nothing wins nothing." In the lead-up to the Sudetenland crisis in 1938, Goebbels took the initiative time and again to use propaganda to whip up sympathy for the Sudeten Germans while campaigning against the Czech government. Still, Goebbels was well aware there was a growing "war panic" in Germany and so by July had the press conduct propaganda efforts at a lower level of intensity. After the Western powers acceded to Hitler's demands concerning Czechoslovakia in 1938, Goebbels soon redirected his propaganda machine against Poland. From May onwards, he orchestrated a campaign against Poland, fabricating stories about atrocities against ethnic Germans in Danzig and other cities. Even so, he was unable to persuade the majority of Germans to welcome the prospect of war. He privately held doubts about the wisdom of risking a protracted war against Britain and France by attacking Poland.

After the Invasion of Poland in September 1939, Goebbels used his propaganda ministry and the Reich chambers to control access to information domestically. To his chagrin, his rival Joachim von Ribbentrop, the Minister for Foreign Affairs, continually challenged Goebbels' jurisdiction over the dissemination of international propaganda. Hitler declined to make a firm ruling on the subject, so the two men remained rivals for the remainder of the Nazi era. Goebbels did not participate in the military decision-making process, nor was he made privy to diplomatic negotiations until after the fact.

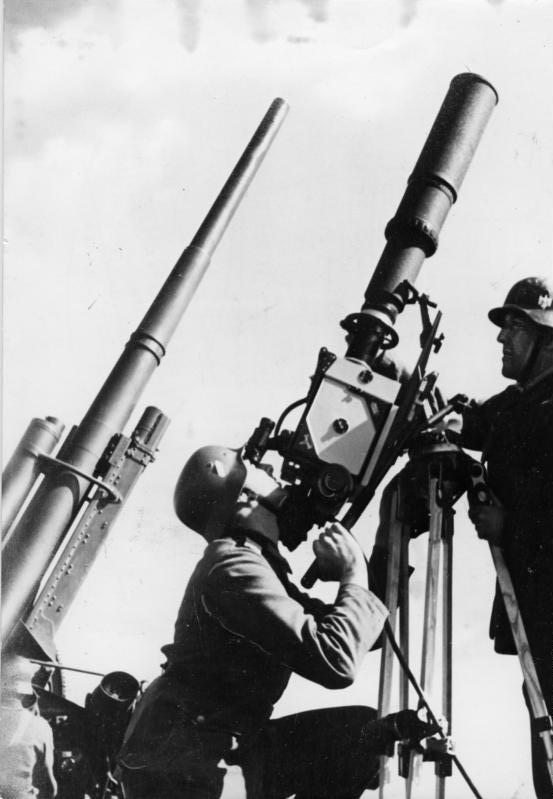
Production of a newsreel at the front lines, January 1941

The Propaganda Ministry took over the broadcasting facilities of conquered countries immediately after surrender, and began broadcasting prepared material using the existing announcers as a way to gain the trust of the citizens. Most aspects of the media, both domestically and in the conquered countries, were controlled by Goebbels and his department. (Note: Rosenberg's foreign ministry retained partial control of foreign propaganda, and the Wehrmacht had its own propaganda organisation. Goebbels' department and duties also overlapped with those of Reich press chief Otto Dietrich. Longerich 2015, p. 693.) The German Home Service, the Armed Forces Programme, and the German European Service were all rigorously controlled in everything from the information they were permitted to disseminate to the music they were allowed to play. Party rallies, speeches, and demonstrations continued; speeches were broadcast on the radio and short propaganda films were exhibited using 1,500 mobile film vans. Hitler made fewer public appearances and broadcasts as the war progressed, so Goebbels increasingly became the voice of the Nazi regime for the German people. From May 1940 he wrote frequent editorials that were published in Das Reich which were later read aloud over the radio. He found films to be his most effective propaganda medium, after radio. At his insistence, initially half the films made in wartime Germany were propaganda films (particularly on antisemitism) and war propaganda films (recounting both historical wars and current exploits of the Wehrmacht).

Goebbels became preoccupied with morale and the efforts of the people on the home front. He believed that the more the people at home were involved in the war effort, the better their morale would be. For example, he initiated a programme for the collection of winter clothing and ski equipment for troops on the eastern front. At the same time, Goebbels implemented changes to have more "entertaining material" in radio and film produced for the public, decreeing in late 1942 that 20 per cent of the films should be propaganda and 80 per cent light entertainment. As Gauleiter of Berlin, Goebbels dealt with increasingly serious shortages of necessities such as food and clothing, as well as the need to ration beer and tobacco, which were important for morale. Hitler suggested watering the beer and degrading the quality of the cigarettes so that more could be produced, but Goebbels refused, saying the cigarettes were already of such low quality that it was impossible to make them any worse. Through his propaganda campaigns, he worked hard to maintain an appropriate level of morale among the public about the military situation, neither too optimistic nor too grim. The series of military setbacks the Germans suffered in this period – the thousand-bomber raid on Cologne (May 1942), the Allied victory at the Second Battle of El Alamein (November 1942), and especially the catastrophic defeat at the Battle of Stalingrad (February 1943) – were difficult matters to present to the German public, who were increasingly weary of the war and sceptical that it could be won. On 16 November 1942 Goebbels, like all Gauleiters, was appointed the Reich Defense Commissioner for his Gau. This enabled him to issue direct instructions to authorities within his jurisdiction in matters concerning the civilian war effort. On 15 January 1943, Hitler appointed Goebbels as head of the newly created Air Raid Damage committee, which meant Goebbels was nominally in charge of nationwide civil air defences and shelters as well as the assessment and repair of damaged buildings. In actuality, the defence of areas other than Berlin remained in the hands of the local Gauleiters, and his main tasks were limited to providing immediate aid to the affected civilians and using propaganda to improve their morale.

By early 1943, the war produced a labour crisis for the regime. Hitler created a three-man committee with representatives of the State, the army, and the party in an attempt to centralise control of the war economy. The committee members were Hans Lammers (head of the Reich Chancellery), Field Marshal Wilhelm Keitel, chief of the Oberkommando der Wehrmacht (Armed Forces High Command; OKW), and Martin Bormann, who controlled the party. The committee was intended to independently propose measures regardless of the wishes of various ministries, with Hitler reserving most final decisions to himself. The committee, soon known as the Dreierausschuß (Committee of Three), met eleven times between January and August 1943. However, they ran up against resistance from Hitler's cabinet ministers, who headed deeply entrenched spheres of influence and were excluded from the committee. Seeing it as a threat to their power, Goebbels, Göring, and Speer worked together to bring it down. The result was that nothing changed, and the Committee of Three declined into irrelevance by September 1943.

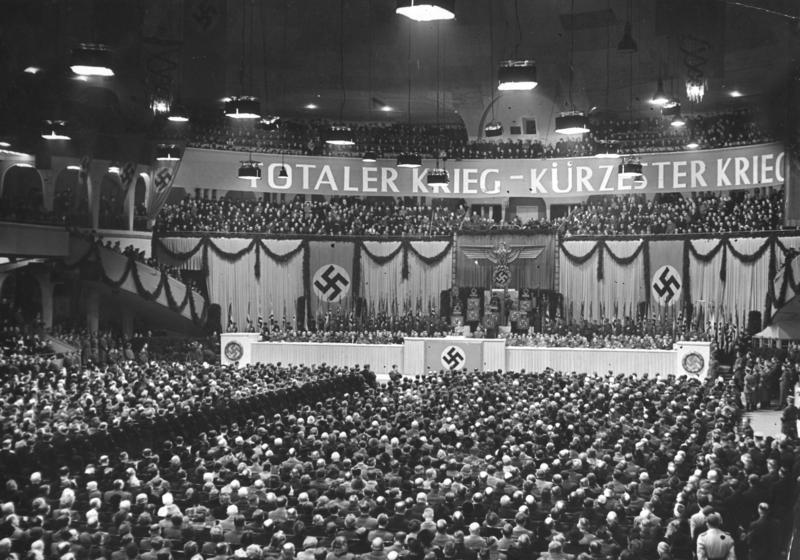
Sportpalast speech, 18 February 1943. The banner says "TOTALER KRIEG – KÜRZESTER KRIEG" ("Total War – Shortest War").

Partly in response to being excluded from the Committee of Three, Goebbels pressured Hitler to introduce measures that would produce "total war", including closing businesses not essential to the war effort, conscripting women into the labour force, and enlisting men in previously exempt occupations into the Wehrmacht. Some of these measures were implemented in an edict of 13 January, but to Goebbels' dismay, Göring demanded that his favourite restaurants in Berlin should remain open, and Lammers successfully lobbied Hitler to have women with children exempted from conscription, even if they had child care available. After receiving an enthusiastic response to his speech of 30 January 1943 on the topic, Goebbels believed he had the support of the German people in his call for total war. His next speech, the Sportpalast speech of 18 February 1943, was a passionate demand for his audience to commit to total war, which he presented as the only way to stop the Bolshevik onslaught and save the German people from destruction. The speech also had a strong antisemitic element and hinted at the extermination of the Jewish people that was already underway. The speech was presented live on radio and was filmed as well. During the live version of the speech, Goebbels accidentally begins to mention the "extermination" of the Jews; this is omitted in the published text of the speech.

Goebbels' efforts had little impact for the time being, because Hitler, who in principle was in favour of total war, was not prepared to implement changes over the objections of his ministers. The discovery around this time of a mass grave of Polish officers that had been killed by the Soviet NKVD in the 1940 Katyn massacre was made use of by Goebbels in his propaganda in an attempt to drive a wedge between the Soviets and the other Western Allies.

=== Plenipotentiary for total war ===
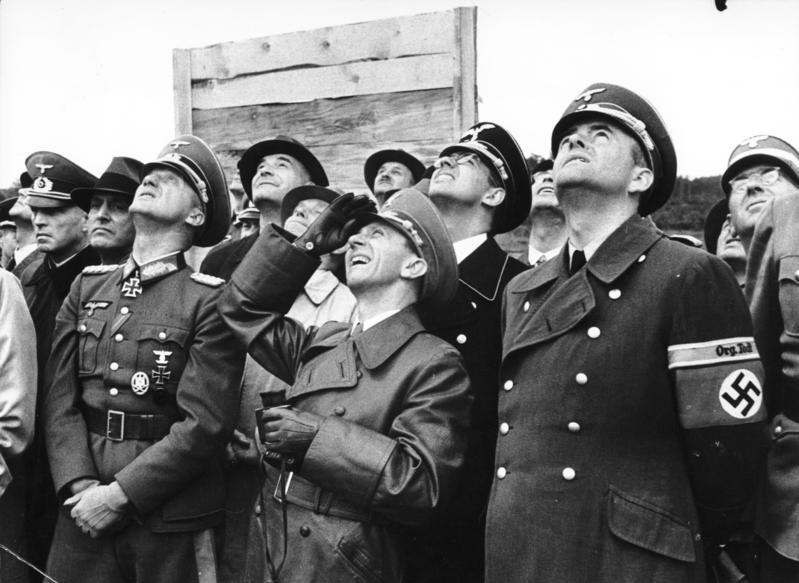
Goebbels (centre) and Armaments Minister Albert Speer (to Goebbels' left) observe rocket tests at Peenemünde, August 1943

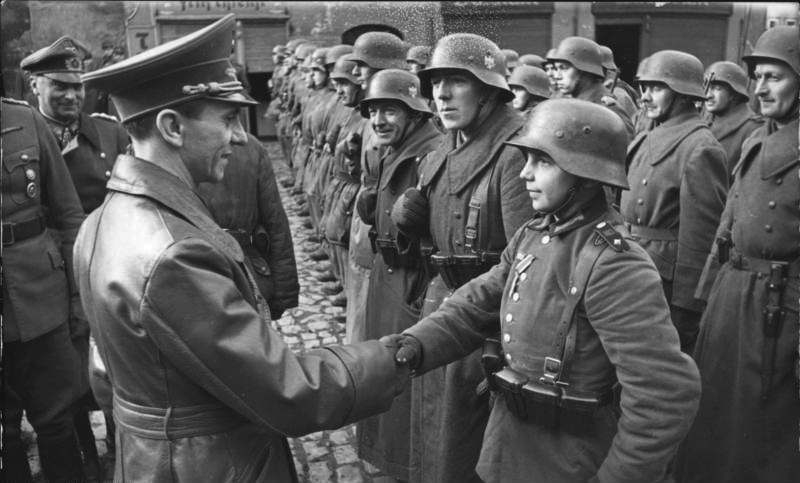
Goebbels awarding 16-year-old Hitler Youth Willi Hübner the Iron Cross for the defence of Lauban (now Lubań in Poland)

After the Allied invasion of Sicily (July 1943) and the strategic Soviet victory in the Battle of Kursk (July–August 1943), Goebbels began to recognise that the war could no longer be won. Following the Allied invasion of Italy and the fall of Mussolini in September, he raised with Hitler the possibility of a separate peace, either with the Soviets or with Britain. Hitler rejected both of these proposals.

As Germany's military and economic situation grew steadily worse, Heinrich Himmler took over the post of interior minister on 25 August 1943, replacing Wilhelm Frick. Intensive air raids on Berlin and other cities took the lives of thousands of people. In December 1943, Hitler asked Goebbels to take on the job of Stadtpräsident (City President) of Berlin, and Goebbels agreed to this as a means of obtaining more direct control over the municipal authorities, though Hitler delayed the formal appointment for several months. Goebbels took over direct administrative control of the city when he was formally named Stadtpräsident on 7 April 1944, thus uniting under his control the city's most powerful party and governmental offices. As air raids on Berlin continued, Göring's Luftwaffe attempted to retaliate with air raids on London in early 1944, but they no longer had sufficient aircraft to make much of an impact. While Goebbels' propaganda in this period indicated that a huge retaliation was in the offing, the V-1 flying bombs, launched on British targets beginning in mid-June 1944, had little effect, with only around 20 per cent reaching their intended targets. To boost morale, Goebbels continued to publish propaganda to the effect that further improvements to these weapons would have a decisive impact on the outcome of the war. Meanwhile, in the Normandy landings of 6 June 1944, the Allies successfully gained a foothold in France.

Throughout July 1944, Goebbels and Speer continued to press Hitler to bring the economy to a total war footing. The 20 July plot, where Hitler was almost killed by a bomb at his field headquarters in East Prussia, played into the hands of those who had been pushing for change: Bormann, Goebbels, Himmler, and Speer. Over the objections of Göring, Goebbels was appointed on 23 July as Reich Plenipotentiary for Total War, charged with maximising the manpower for the Wehrmacht and the armaments industry at the expense of sectors of the economy not critical to the war effort. Through these efforts, he was able to free up an additional half a million men for military service. However, as many of these new recruits came from the armaments industry, the move put him in conflict with armaments minister Speer. Untrained workers from elsewhere were not readily absorbed into the armaments industry, and likewise, the new Wehrmacht recruits waited in barracks for their turn to be trained.

Hitler ordered a nationwide militia of men previously considered unsuitable for military service — the Volkssturm (People's Storm) — to be formed on 25 September 1944; it was launched on 18 October. In his capacity as Gauleiter and Reich Defense Commissioner, Goebbels was named Führer des Deutschen Volkssturms im Gau Groß-Berlin on 25 September 1944, and he administered the oath of allegiance to the assembled Berlin Volkssturm troops on 12 November. Goebbels recorded in his diary that 100,000 recruits were sworn in from his Gau alone. However, the men, mostly age 45 to 60, received only rudimentary training and many were not properly armed. Goebbels' notion that these men could effectively serve on the front lines against Soviet tanks and artillery was unrealistic at best. The programme was deeply unpopular.

Goebbels realised that his influence would diminish in wartime. He suffered a series of setbacks as propaganda became less important compared to warfare, the war economy, and the Allied bombing of German cities. Historian Michael Balfour states that from 1942 onward, Goebbels, "lost control over Nazi policy toward the press and over the handling of news in general." Rival agencies expanded. The foreign ministry assumed responsibility for propaganda outside Germany. The military established its own propaganda division, providing daily reports on the progress of the war and the conditions of the armed forces. The Nazi Party also generated and distributed its own propaganda during the war. Goebbels remained influential when he had the opportunity to meet with Hitler, who became increasingly unavailable as he moved his headquarters closer to the military front lines. They met perhaps once a month. Furthermore, Hitler rarely delivered speeches or attended rallies of the kind that had dominated propaganda in the 1930s. After Hitler returned to Berlin in 1945, Goebbels' ministry was destroyed by an Allied air raid on 13 March, making it exceedingly difficult for him to disseminate propaganda. In April 1945, he assumed responsibility for the work rival agencies had been doing and took full control of propaganda, but by that time, the Soviet Red Army had already entered Berlin. Goebbels was an astute observer of the war, and historians have extensively examined his diary for insights into how the Nazi leadership attempted to maintain public morale.

=== Defeat and death ===
In the last months of the war, Goebbels' speeches and articles took on an increasingly apocalyptic tone. By the beginning of 1945, with the Soviets on the Oder River and the Western Allies preparing to cross the Rhine River, he could no longer disguise the inevitability of German defeat. Berlin had little in the way of fortifications or artillery, and even Volkssturm units were in short supply, as almost everything and everyone had been sent to the front. Goebbels noted in his diary on 21 January that millions of Germans were fleeing westward. He tentatively discussed with Hitler the issue of making peace overtures to the Western Allies, but Hitler again refused. Privately, Goebbels was conflicted at pushing the case with Hitler since he did not want to lose Hitler's confidence.

When other Nazi leaders urged Hitler to leave Berlin and establish a new centre of resistance in the National Redoubt in Bavaria, Goebbels opposed this, arguing for a heroic last stand in Berlin. His family (except for Magda's son Harald, who had served in the Luftwaffe and been captured by the Allies) moved into their house in Berlin to await the end. He and Magda may have discussed suicide and the fate of their young children in a long meeting on the night of 27 January. He knew how the outside world would view the criminal acts committed by the regime and had no desire to subject himself to the "debacle" of a trial. He burned his private papers on the night of 18 April.

Goebbels knew how to play on Hitler's fantasies, encouraging him to see the hand of providence in the death of United States president Franklin D. Roosevelt on 12 April. Whether Hitler really saw this event as a turning point as Goebbels proclaimed is not known. By this time, Goebbels had gained the position he had wanted so long—at Hitler's side. Göring was utterly discredited, although he was not stripped of his offices until 23 April. Himmler, whose appointment as commander of Army Group Vistula had led to disaster on the Oder, was also in disgrace with Hitler. Most of Hitler's inner circle, including Göring, Himmler, Ribbentrop, and Speer, prepared to leave Berlin immediately after Hitler's birthday celebration on 20 April. Even Bormann was "not anxious" to meet his end at Hitler's side. On 22 April, Hitler announced that he would stay in Berlin until the end and then shoot himself. Goebbels moved with his family into the Vorbunker, connected to the lower Führerbunker under the Reich Chancellery garden in central Berlin, that same day. He told Vice-Admiral Hans-Erich Voss that he would not entertain the idea of either surrender or escape. On 23 April, Goebbels made the following proclamation to the people of Berlin:

I call on you to fight for your city. Fight with everything you have got, for the sake of your wives and your children, your mothers and your parents. Your arms are defending everything we have ever held dear, and all the generations that will come after us. Be proud and courageous! Be inventive and cunning! Your Gauleiter is amongst you. He and his colleagues will remain in your midst. His wife and children are here as well. He, who once captured the city with 200 men, will now use every means to galvanize the defence of the capital. The battle for Berlin must become the signal for the whole nation to rise up in battle.

After midnight on 29 April, with the Soviets advancing ever closer to the bunker complex, Hitler married Eva Braun in a small civil ceremony in the Führerbunker. (Note: The MI5 website, using the sources available to Hugh Trevor-Roper (an MI5 agent and author of The Last Days of Hitler), records the marriage as taking place after Hitler had dictated his last will and testament. MI5, Hitler's Last Days) Afterward, he hosted a modest wedding breakfast. Hitler then took secretary Traudl Junge to another room and dictated his last will and testament. Goebbels and Bormann were two of the witnesses.

In his last will and testament, Hitler named no successor as Führer or leader of the Nazi Party. Instead, he appointed Goebbels as Reich Chancellor; Grand Admiral Karl Dönitz, who was at Flensburg near the Danish border, as Reich President; and Bormann as Party Minister. Goebbels wrote a postscript to the will stating that he would "categorically refuse" to obey Hitler's order to leave Berlin—as he put it, "the first time in my life" that he had not complied with Hitler's orders. He felt compelled to remain with Hitler "for reasons of humanity and personal loyalty". His wife and children would stay as well. They would end their lives "side by side with the Führer".

In the mid-afternoon of 30 April, Hitler shot himself. Goebbels was depressed, and said he would walk around the Chancellery garden until he was killed by the Russian shelling. Voss later recounted Goebbels as saying: "It is a great pity that such a man [Hitler] is not with us any longer. But there is nothing to be done. For us, everything is lost now and the only way out left for us is the one Hitler chose. I shall follow his example."

On 1 May, Goebbels carried out his sole official act as Chancellor: he dictated a letter to General Vasily Chuikov and ordered German General Hans Krebs to deliver it under a white flag. Chuikov, as commander of the Soviet 8th Guards Army, commanded the Soviet forces in central Berlin. Goebbels' letter informed Chuikov of Hitler's death and requested a ceasefire. After this was rejected, Goebbels decided that further efforts were futile.

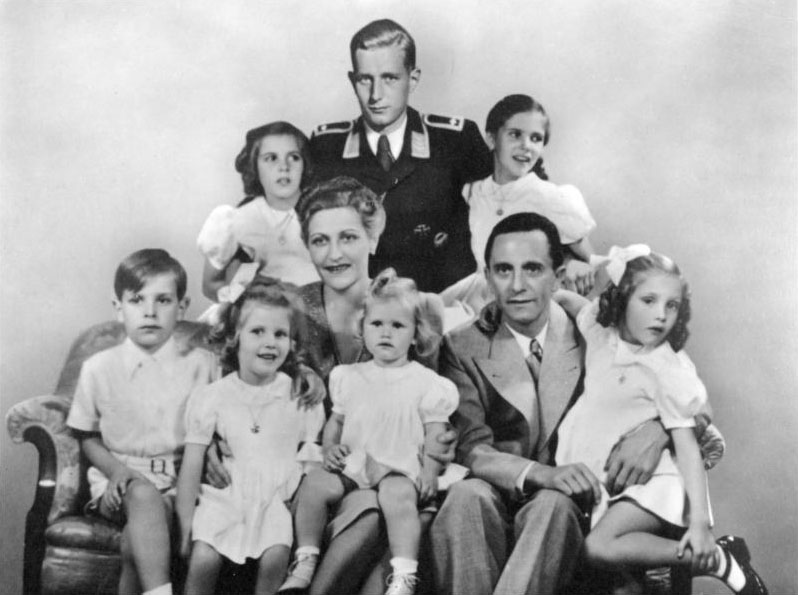
The Goebbels family, including Goebbels' stepson, Harald Quandt

Later on 1 May, Voss saw Goebbels for the last time: "While saying goodbye I asked Goebbels to join us. But he replied: 'The captain must not leave his sinking ship. I have thought about it all and decided to stay here. I have nowhere to go because with little children I will not be able to make it, especially with a leg like mine'." On the evening of 1 May, Goebbels arranged for an SS dentist, Helmut Kunz, to inject his six children with morphine so that when they were unconscious, an ampule of a cyanide compound could be then crushed in each of their mouths. According to Kunz's later testimony, he gave the children morphine injections but Magda Goebbels and SS-Obersturmbannführer Ludwig Stumpfegger, Hitler's personal doctor, administered the cyanide.

At around 20:30, Goebbels and Magda left the bunker and walked up to the garden of the Chancellery, where they killed themselves. There are several different accounts of this event. One is that they each bit on a cyanide ampule near where Hitler had been buried and were given a coup de grâce immediately afterward. Goebbels' SS adjutant Günther Schwägermann testified in 1948 that they walked ahead of him up the stairs and out into the Chancellery garden. He waited in the stairwell and heard shots. Schwägermann then walked up the remaining stairs and, once outside, saw their lifeless bodies. Following Goebbels' prior order, Schwägermann had an SS soldier fire several shots into Goebbels' body, which did not move. In a contradictory account, SS-Oberscharführer Rochus Misch claimed that mechanic Johannes Hentschel told him that early on 2 May, Goebbels killed himself in his room in the Führerbunker, while Magda did so in the Vorbunker.

The corpses were then doused with petrol, but they were only partially burned and not buried. A few days later, the Soviets brought Voss back to the bunker to identify the Goebbels' partly burned bodies. The remains of the Goebbels family, Krebs, and Hitler's dogs were repeatedly buried and exhumed. The last burial was at the SMERSH facility in Magdeburg on 21 February 1946. In 1970, KGB director Yuri Andropov authorised an operation to destroy the remains. On 4 April 1970, a Soviet KGB team used detailed burial charts to exhume five wooden boxes at the Magdeburg SMERSH facility. They were burned, crushed, and scattered into the Biederitz river, a tributary of the nearby Elbe.

== Family life ==
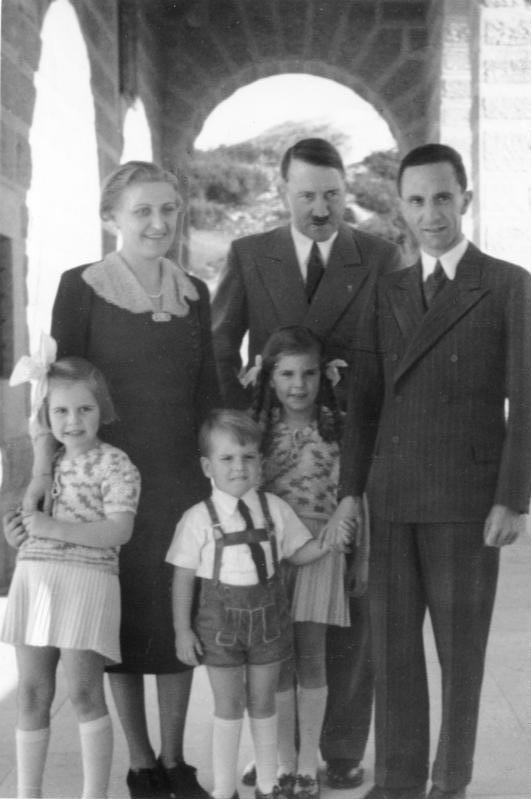
Post-reconciliation photo commissioned by Hitler, 1938

Hitler was very fond of Magda and the children. He enjoyed staying at the Goebbels' Berlin apartment, where he could relax. Magda had a close relationship with Hitler, and became a member of his small coterie of female friends. She also became an unofficial representative of the regime, receiving letters from all over Germany from women with questions about domestic matters or child custody issues.

In 1936, Goebbels met the Czech actress Lída Baarová and by the winter of 1937 began an intense affair with her. Magda had a long conversation with Hitler about it on 15 August 1938. Unwilling to put up with a scandal involving one of his top ministers, Hitler demanded that Goebbels break off the relationship. Thereafter, Joseph and Magda seemed to reach a truce until the end of September. The couple had another falling out at that point, and again Hitler became involved, insisting the couple stay together. He arranged for publicity photos to be taken of himself with the reconciled couple in October. Goebbels also had short-term affairs and relationships with numerous other women. Magda too had affairs, including a relationship with Kurt Lüdecke in 1933 and Karl Hanke in 1938.

The Goebbels family included Harald Quandt (Magda's son from her first marriage; b. 1921), plus Helga (b. 1932), Hilde (b. 1934), Helmut (b. 1935), Holde (b. 1937), Hedda (b. 1938), and Heide (b. 1940). Harald was the only member of the family to survive the war. He died in an aeroplane crash in 1967.

Goebbels predicted prior to his death that "We shall go down in history as the greatest statesmen of all time, or as the greatest criminals."

== See also ==
- Art in Nazi Germany
- Big lie
- Goebbels Diaries
- Gottbegnadeten list
- Hate media
- List of Nazi Party leaders and officials
- Propaganda in Nazi Germany
- Reich Chamber of Culture
- Villa Bogensee

Party political offices
Preceded by Ernst Schlange	Gauleiter of Berlin; 26 October 1926–1 May 1945	Position abolished
Political offices
Position established	Minister of Public Enlightenment and Propaganda; 14 March 1933–30 April 1945	Succeeded by Werner Naumann
Preceded by Ludwig Steeg	Stadtpräsident of Berlin; 7 April 1944–1 May 1945	Succeeded by Position abolished
Position established	Reich Plenipotentiary for Total War; 23 July 1944—1 May 1945	Succeeded by None
Preceded by Adolf Hitler	Chancellor of Germany; 30 April 1945—1 May 1945	Succeeded by Lutz Graf Schwerin von Krosigk
Military offices
Preceded by None	Commander of the Volkssturm in Gau Berlin; 25 September 1944—1 May 1945	Succeeded by None
Sporting positions
Preceded by (United States) Godfrey Dewey	President of Organizing Committee for Winter Olympic Games; 1936	Succeeded by (Switzerland) Alfred Schläppi & Heinrich Schläppi
Preceded by (United States) George Bryant	President of Organizing Committee for Summer Olympic Games (with Karl Ritter von Halt); 1936	Succeeded by (United Kingdom) Lord Burghley
