= Downfall (2004 film) =

2004 film by Oliver Hirschbiegel

- Theatrical release poster
- Directed by: Oliver Hirschbiegel
- Screenplay by: Bernd Eichinger
- Based on: Inside Hitler's Bunker by Joachim Fest; Until the Final Hour by; Traudl Junge; Melissa Müller
- Produced by: Bernd Eichinger
- Starring: Bruno Ganz; Alexandra Maria Lara; Corinna Harfouch; Ulrich Matthes; Juliane Köhler; Heino Ferch; Christian Berkel; Alexander Held; Matthias Habich; Thomas Kretschmann
- Cinematography: Rainer Klausmann
- Edited by: Hans Funck
- Music by: Stephan Zacharias
- Production company: Constantin Film
- Distributed by: Constantin Film (Germany and Austria); 01 Distribution (Italy)
- Release dates: 8 September 2004 (Germany); 10 September 2004 (Austria)
- Running time: 155 minutes
- Countries: Germany; Italy; Austria
- Language: German
- Budget: €13.5M (~US$16M)
- Box office: US$92.2M

Downfall (German: Der Untergang) is a 2004 German historical war drama film written and produced by Bernd Eichinger and directed by Oliver Hirschbiegel. It depicts the final days of Adolf Hitler (portrayed by Bruno Ganz), during the Battle of Berlin in World War II, when Nazi Germany is on the verge of total defeat at the hands of the Allies. The cast includes Alexandra Maria Lara, Corinna Harfouch, Ulrich Matthes, Juliane Köhler, Heino Ferch, Christian Berkel, Alexander Held, Matthias Habich, and Thomas Kretschmann. The film is a German-Austrian-Italian co-production.

Principal photography took place from September to November 2003, on location in Berlin, Munich, and Saint Petersburg, Russia. As the film is set in and around the Führerbunker, Hirschbiegel used eyewitness accounts, survivors' memoirs, and other historical sources during production to reconstruct the look and atmosphere of 1940s Berlin. The screenplay was based on the books Inside Hitler's Bunker by historian Joachim Fest and Until the Final Hour by Traudl Junge, one of Hitler's secretaries, among other accounts of the period.

The film premiered at the Toronto Film Festival on 14 September 2004. It was controversial with audiences for showing a human side of Hitler and members of the Third Reich. It later received a wide theatrical release in Germany under its production company Constantin Film. The film grossed over US$92 million. Downfall was a critical and commercial success, with international acclaim for the cast's performances (especially Ganz's portrayal of Hitler), Hirschbiegel's direction, and Eichinger's screenplay. It was nominated for Best Foreign Language Film at the 77th Academy Awards.

== Plot ==
In November 1942, Adolf Hitler interviews young women for the position of personal secretary in the Wolf's Lair and chooses Traudl Junge.

On 20 April 1945, Hitler's 56th birthday, Berlin comes under fire from Red Army artillery, beginning the Battle of Berlin. Reichsführer-SS Heinrich Himmler, unable to persuade Hitler to flee Berlin, leaves to secretly negotiate with the Allies. SS-Gruppenführer Hermann Fegelein, Himmler's liaison officer and brother-in-law to Hitler's companion Eva Braun, is also unable to persuade Hitler to leave. SS doctor Obersturmbannführer Ernst-Günther Schenck remains in Berlin in defiance of Operation Clausewitz, granted permission to safeguard the health of the civilian population. The father of Hitler Youth member Peter Kranz, who has been conscripted to fight, tries to persuade him to desert but Peter denounces his father.

At a meeting in the Führerbunker, Hitler forbids the overwhelmed 9th Army to retreat, ordering Obergruppenführer Felix Steiner's units and Lieutenant General Walther Wenck's 12th Army to counter-attack. Hitler makes a rare foray out of the bunker to award Peter, who has destroyed two enemy tanks, the Iron Cross, hailing him as braver than his generals. Hitler then talks to armaments minister Albert Speer about his scorched-earth policy. Speer disagrees with the destruction of Germany's infrastructure, but Hitler believes the German people are weak and deserve death. Eva Braun holds a party in the Reich Chancellery, which is broken up by artillery fire, and refuses Fegelein's pleas to leave Berlin with him.

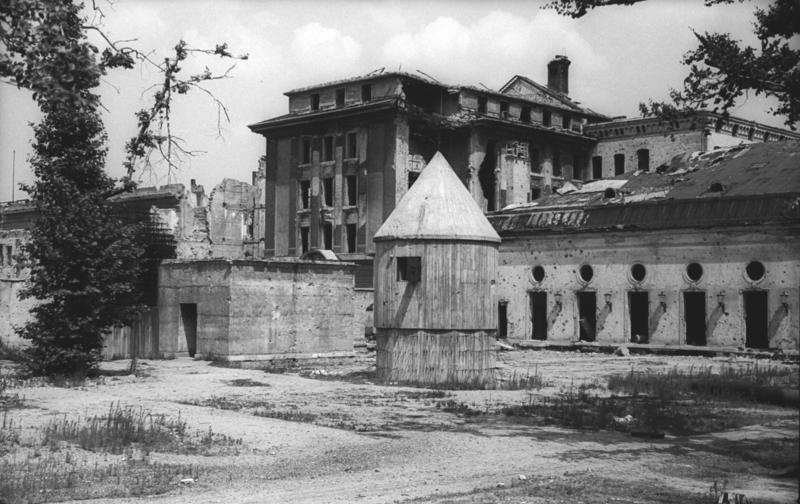
The real-life Führerbunker as pictured in 1947

When General Helmuth Weidling learns he has been sentenced to death for allegedly moving his command post, he reports to the Führerbunker to clear himself. His action actually impresses Hitler, who promotes him commander of Berlin's defence. Weidling mutters that he would have rather the Führer carry out his death sentence instead.

When Hitler learns Steiner's weakened forces did not counter-attack as ordered, he launches into a furious tirade, denouncing his generals and for the first time openly acknowledges the war is lost. He promises to commit suicide rather than surrender or leave Berlin.

SS-Brigadeführer Wilhelm Mohnke asks Propaganda Minister Joseph Goebbels to stop sending inexperienced soldiers into the fighting, but Goebbels replies he has no sympathy and that the German people, who proved weaker than their enemies, deserve their fate. Hitler receives a message from Reichsmarschall Hermann Göring, requesting state leadership for himself in the absence of Hitler's freedom of action. Hitler orders Göring's arrest for treason. Speer makes a final visit to the Führerbunker and admits he has defied the scorched earth order. Hitler, emotionally overcome by the betrayal, dismisses Speer without punishment and lets him leave Berlin.

Hitler learns of Himmler's secret negotiations with the Allies and orders his execution. SS physician Obergruppenführer Ernst-Robert Grawitz is refused permission by Hitler to leave Berlin. Fearing Soviet reprisal, he kills himself and his family with hand grenades. Hitler discovers Fegelein's plans to desert and has him executed despite Braun's pleas.

As conditions worsen in Berlin, Hitler hopes Wenck's 12th Army will turn the tide. Hitler dictates his last will and testament to Junge before marrying Braun in an early morning ceremony. When Hitler learns that the 12th Army is unable to save Berlin, he plans his suicide, testing the poison on his dog Blondi. After bidding farewell to his staff, and refusing a final plea by Magda Goebbels to escape, he comes to realises the war has been lost. Declaring his defeat, he retreats into his private room and fatally shoots himself in the head.

General Hans Krebs fails to negotiate a ceasefire with Red Army Colonel General Vasily Chuikov, who insists on Germany's unconditional surrender and the full Soviet takeover of Berlin. Goebbels poisons their six children with cyanide capsules before committing suicide. Krebs and Wilhelm Burgdorf also commit suicide before Weidling announces the unconditional surrender of German forces in Berlin. Peter, sole survivor of his unit, discovers that his parents were executed. The remaining occupants of the bunker attempt to break out from the city. German diplomat SS-Brigadeführer Walther Hewel commits suicide as well, despite Schenck's attempts to persuade him to live. Only Junge successfully escapes, joined by Peter. The two find an abandoned bicycle and escape Berlin.

On May 8, the German government, with Karl Dönitz as Chancellor and the capital moved to Flensburg, unconditionally surrendered to the Allied forces, marking the end of the war for Germany. The film concludes with documentary footage of an elderly Junge confessing that her youthful ignorance should have been no excuse for her involvement in the Nazi regime.

== Cast ==
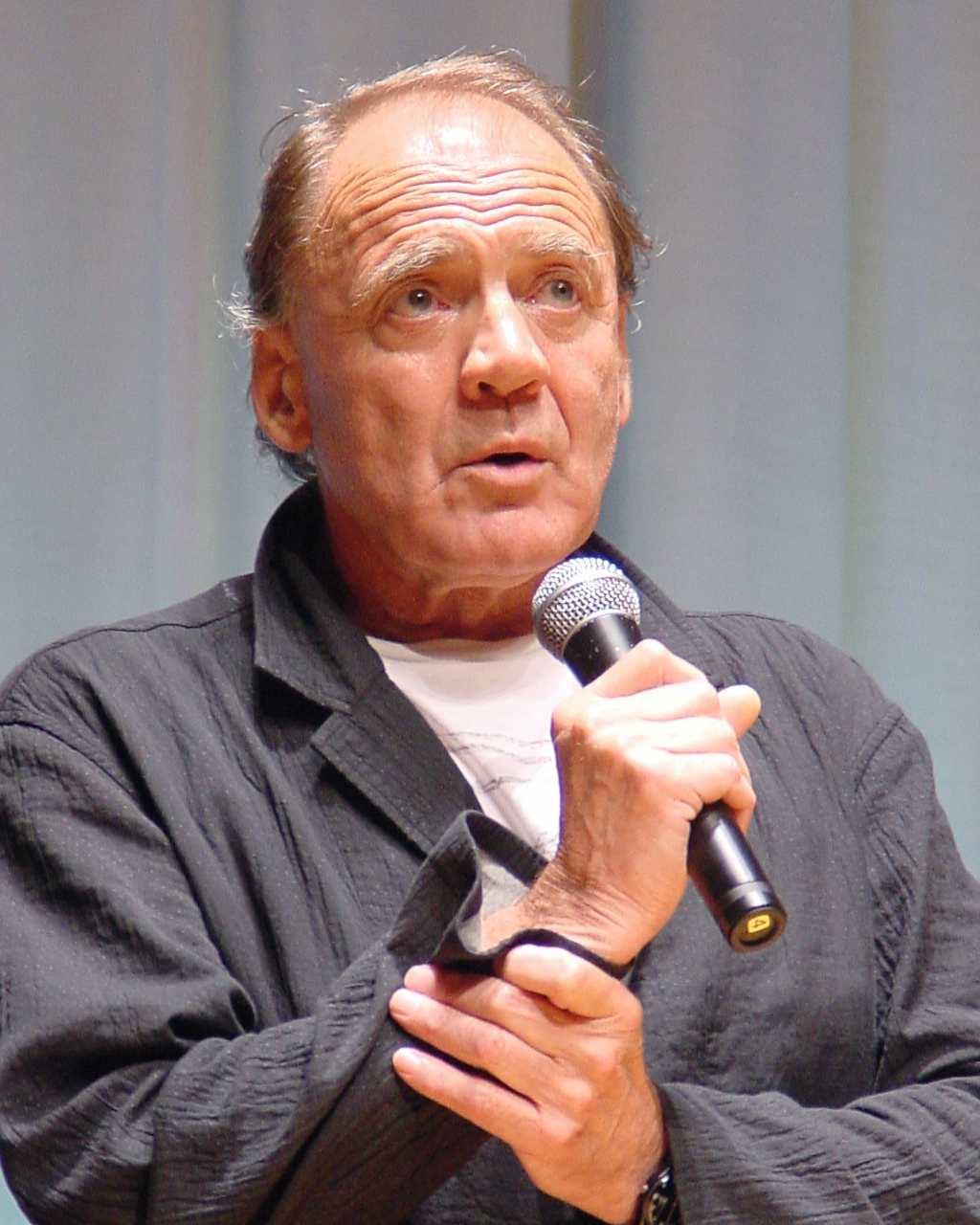
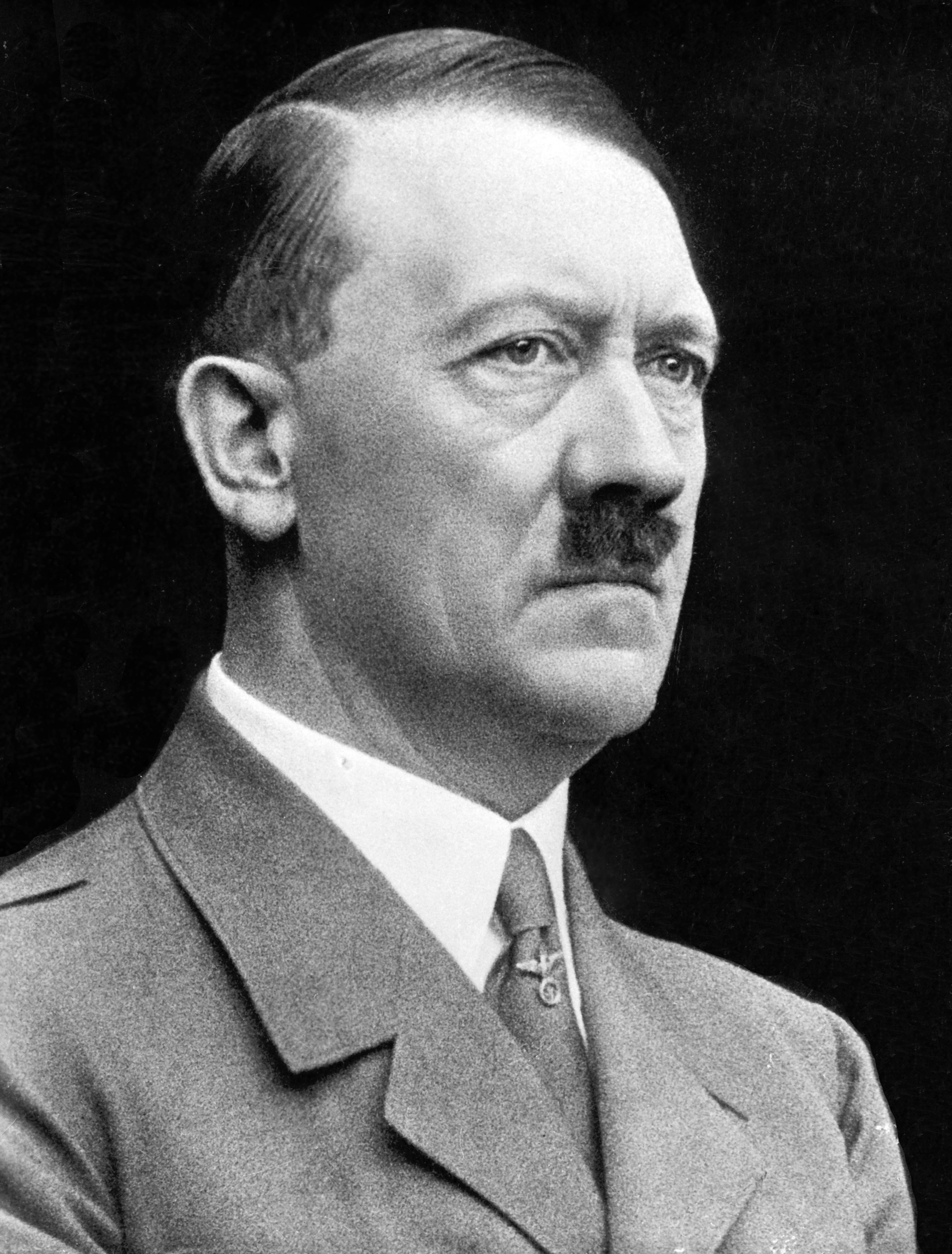
Bruno Ganz (left) portrays Adolf Hitler.

=== Nazi Party and German civilians ===
- Bruno Ganz as Adolf Hitler
- Alexandra Maria Lara as Traudl Junge
  - The real Junge appears in opening and the closing of the film via footage from the documentary Im toten Winkel.
- Ulrich Matthes as Joseph Goebbels
- Corinna Harfouch as Magda Goebbels
- Juliane Köhler as Eva Braun
- Birgit Minichmayr as Gerda Christian
- Donevan Gunia as Peter Kranz
- Karl Kranzkowski as Wilhelm Kranz
- Ulrike Krumbiegel as Dorothee Kranz
- Michael Brandner as Hans Fritzsche
- Anna Thalbach as Hanna Reitsch
- Bettina Redlich as Constanze Manziarly
- Elizaveta Boyarskaya as Erna Flegel
- Oliver Stritzel as Johannes Hentschel
- Heino Ferch as Albert Speer

=== Wehrmacht ===
- Mathias Gnädinger as Hermann Göring
- Dieter Mann as Wilhelm Keitel
- Dietrich Hollinderbäumer as Robert Ritter von Greim
- Christian Redl as Alfred Jodl
- Rolf Kanies as Hans Krebs
- Michael Mendl as Helmuth Weidling
- Justus von Dohnányi as Wilhelm Burgdorf
- Hans H. Steinberg as Karl Koller
- Klaus B. Wolf as Alwin-Broder Albrecht
- Devid Striesow as Fritz Tornow

=== Schutzstaffel ===
- Ulrich Noethen as Heinrich Himmler
- Thomas Thieme as Martin Bormann
- Christian Hoening as Ernst-Robert Grawitz
- Thomas Kretschmann as Hermann Fegelein
- Alexander Held as Walther Hewel
- André Hennicke as Wilhelm Mohnke
- Matthias Habich as Werner Haase
- Thomas Limpinsel as Heinz Linge
- Thorsten Krohn as Ludwig Stumpfegger
- Jürgen Tonkel as Erich Kempka
- Igor Romanov as Peter Högl
- Igor Bubenchikov as Franz Schädle
- Christian Berkel as Ernst-Günther Schenck
- Fabian Busch as Gert Stehr
- Götz Otto as Otto Günsche
- Heinrich Schmieder as Rochus Misch

Additional cast members in smaller roles include Julia Jentsch as Hannah Potrovsky, Alexander Slastin as Vasily Chuikov, Elena Dreyden as Inge Dombrowski, Norbert Heckner as Walter Wagner, Silke Nikowski as Frau Grawitz, Leopold von Buttlar as Sohn Grawitz, Veit Stübner as Tellermann, Boris Schwarzmann as Matvey Blanter, Vsevolod Tsurilo as Russian Adjutant, Vasily Reutov as Theodor von Dufving. The Goebbels children are portrayed by Alina Sokar (Helga), Charlotte Stoiber (Hilda), Gregory Borlein (Helmut), Julia Bauer (Hedda), Laura Borlein (Holde), and Amelie Menges (Heide).

== Production ==
=== Development ===
Producer and screenwriter Bernd Eichinger wanted to make a film about Adolf Hitler and the Nazi Party for twenty years but was, at first, discouraged after its enormity prevented him from doing so. Eichinger was inspired to begin the filmmaking process after reading Inside Hitler's Bunker: The Last Days of the Third Reich (2002) by historian Joachim Fest. Eichinger also based the film on the memoirs of Traudl Junge, one of Hitler's secretaries, called Until the Final Hour: Hitler's Last Secretary (2002). When writing the screenplay, he used the books Inside the Third Reich (1969), by Albert Speer, one of the highest-ranking Nazi officials to survive both the war and the Nuremberg trials; Hitler's Last Days: An Eye-Witness Account (1973), by Gerhard Boldt; Das Notlazarett unter der Reichskanzlei: Ein Arzt erlebt Hitlers Ende in Berlin (1995) by Ernst-Günther Schenck; and Soldat: Reflections of a German Soldier, 1936–1949 (1992) by Siegfried Knappe as references.

After completing the script for the film, Eichinger presented it to director Oliver Hirschbiegel. Though he was interested in exploring how the people of Germany "could have plumbed such depths", as a German, Hirschbiegel hesitated to take it as he "reacted to the idea of Nazism as a taboo". Hirschbiegel eventually agreed to helm the project, stating that he "noticed that it just wouldn't leave me in peace, and in my heart, before accepting the project, I knew that I had already opened myself up to it."

Downfall is the first German film to broach the subject of Hitler straight-on since The Last Ten Days (1955).

=== Casting ===
When Bruno Ganz, who was Hirschbiegel's first choice for the role, was offered the role of Hitler, being sent the screenplay and Fest's book, he was reluctant to accept the part, and many of his friends advised against it, but he believed that the subject had "a fascinating side", and ultimately agreed to take the role. Ganz watched The Last Ten Days, in which Albin Skoda played Hitler, which convinced Ganz that it was really possible to play the dictator. Ganz studied the Hitler and Mannerheim recording for four months to properly mimic Hitler's conversational voice and Austrian dialect. Ganz came to the conclusion that Hitler had Parkinson's disease, noting his observation of Hitler's shaky body movements present in the newsreel Die Deutsche Wochenschau, and decided to visit a hospital to study patients with the disease. Ganz auditioned in the casting studio with makeup for half an hour and tested his voice for Hirschbiegel who was convinced by his performance.

Alexandra Maria Lara was cast as Traudl Junge; she was given Junge's book Until the Final Hour (2002), which she called her "personal treasure", to read during filming. Before she was cast, she had seen André Heller's documentary film Im toten Winkel which impressed her and influenced her perspective on Junge.

=== Filming and design ===
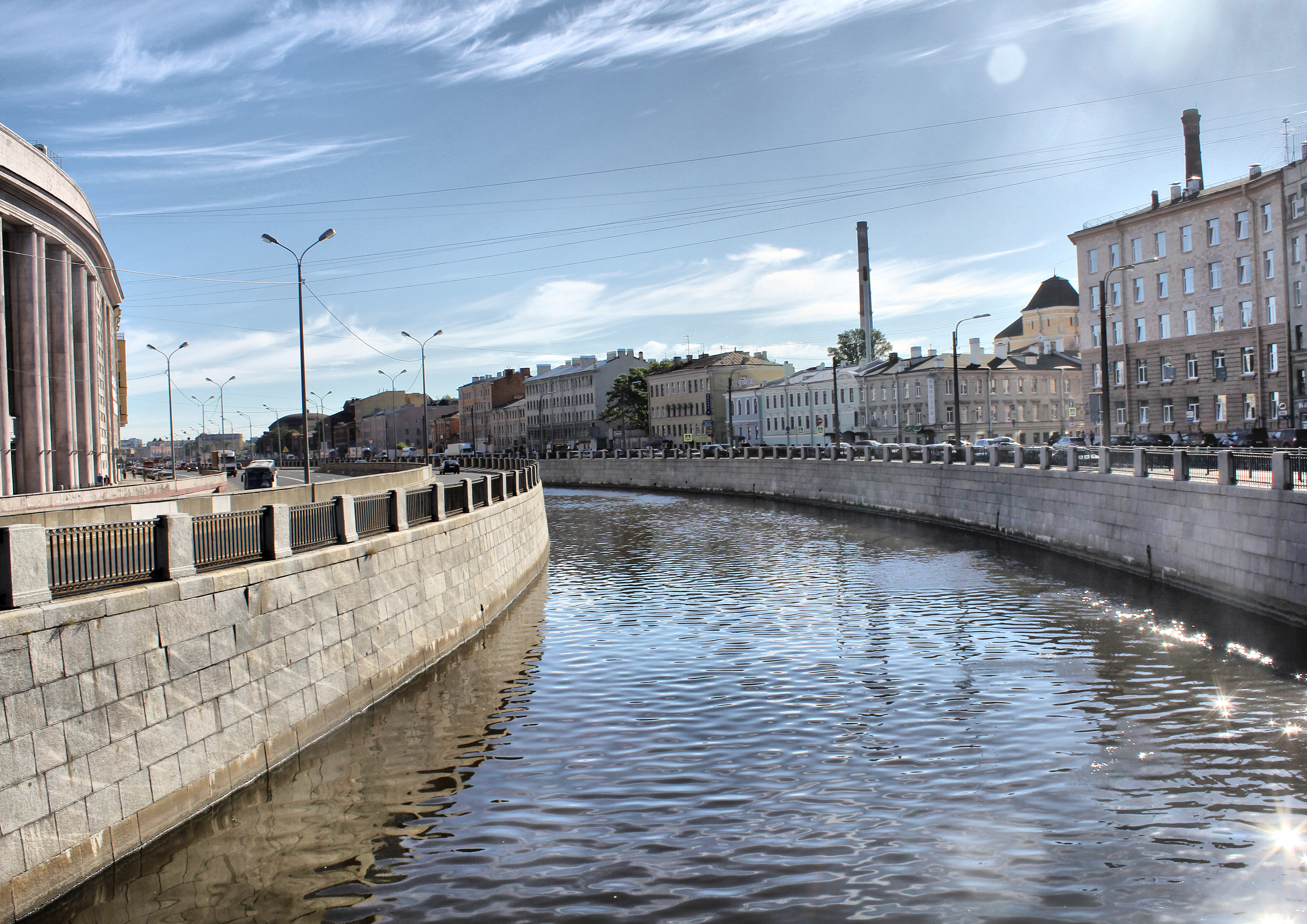
Filming took place near the Obvodny Canal in Saint Petersburg in a run-down industrial district to imitate the setting for Berlin.

Principal photography lasted twelve weeks from September to November 2003, under the working title Sunset. The film is set mostly in and around the Führerbunker; Hirschbiegel made an effort to accurately reconstruct the look and atmosphere of World War II through eyewitness accounts, survivors' memoirs, and other historical sources. Hirschbiegel filmed in the cities of Berlin, Munich, and Saint Petersburg, Russia, with a run-down industrial district along the Obvodny Canal used to portray the historical setting in Berlin. Hirschbiegel noted the depressing atmosphere surrounding the shoot, finding relief through listening to Johann Sebastian Bach's music. Alexandra Maria Lara also mentioned the depressing and intense atmosphere during filming. To lighten the mood, Lara's colleagues engaged in activities such as football, while Ganz tried to keep a happy mood by retiring during shooting breaks.

The film was produced on a €13.5 million budget. The bunker and Hitler's Wolf's Lair were constructed at Bavaria Studios in Munich by production designer Bernd Lepel. The damaged Reich Chancellery was depicted through the use of computer-generated imagery (CGI). Hirschbiegel decided to limit the use of CGI, props and sets so as not to make the set design look like that of a theatre production, explaining:

The only CGI shot that's been used in the film was the one with the [Reich Chancellery] because of course we could not reconstruct that – that's the only thing. I'm very proud of that, because if you do a war movie, you cannot do that and build sets. You feel the cardboard. You feel that it's all made to entertain, and it takes away from that horror that war basically means.

== Themes ==
According to Eichinger, the film's overlying idea was to make a film about Hitler and wartime Germany that was very close to historical truth, as part of a theme that would allow the German nation to save their own history and "experience their own trauma". To accomplish this, the film explores Hitler's decisions and motives during his final days through the perspective of the individuals who lived in the Führerbunker during those times. Eichinger chose not to include mention of the Holocaust because it was not the topic of the film. He also thought it was "impossible" to show the "misery" and "desperation" of the concentration camps cinematically.

=== Portrayal ===
During production, Hirschbiegel believed that Hitler would often charm people using his personality, only to manipulate and betray them. Many of the people in the film, including Traudl Junge, are shown to be enthusiastic in interacting with Hitler instead of feeling threatened or anxious by his presence and authority. The production team sought to give Hitler a three-dimensional personality, with Hirschbiegel telling NBC: "We know from all accounts that he was a very charming man – a man who managed to seduce a whole people into barbarism." He said Hitler was "like a shell", attracting people with self-pity, but inside the shell was only "an enormous will for destruction".

The film explores the suicides and deaths of the Nazi Party as opposed to the people who choose life. Hitler's provision of cyanide pills to those in the bunker and the Goebbels' murder of their children are shown as selfish deeds while people such as Schenck, who chose to help the injured and escape death, are shown as rational and generous. In the DVD commentary, Hirschbiegel said that the events in the film were "derived from the accounts, from descriptions of people" in the bunker. The film also includes an introduction and closing with the real Junge in an interview from Im toten Winkel, where she admits feeling guilt for "not recognizing this monster in time".

== Release ==
Downfall premiered at the Toronto Film Festival on 14 September 2004. After first failing to find a distributor, the film was eventually released on 16 September in Germany by Constantin Film. It premiered in the US in Manhattan on 18 February 2005, under Newmarket Films. On its broadcast in the UK, Channel 4 marketed it with the strapline: "It's a happy ending. He dies."

=== Box office and awards ===
Downfall sold nearly half a million tickets in Germany for its opening weekend and attracted 4.5 million viewers in the first three months. The final North American gross was $5,509,040, while $86,671,870 was made with its foreign gross. The film made $93.6 million altogether.

Downfall was nominated for Best Foreign Language Film at the 77th Academy Awards. It won the 2005 BBC Four World Cinema competition. The film was also ranked number 48 in Empire magazine's "The 100 Best Films Of World Cinema" in 2010.

=== Home media ===
The film was released on DVD on 2 August 2005, by Sony Pictures Home Entertainment. Shout! Factory released a collector's edition Blu-ray in March 2018, with a making-of featurette, cast and crew interviews, and audio commentary from director Oliver Hirschbiegel. The film was released on Ultra HD Blu-ray in Germany in 2024.

=== Extended version ===
In addition to the theatrical version, which has a length of 150 minutes, there was also an extended version produced especially for television. First aired by Das Erste on 19 October 2005, the 25 minutes longer Extended Version was played in two parts each with a length of approximately 90 minutes. Later it was also released on DVD. The Extended Version features many new scenes in the bunker and shows more of the bombed-out Berlin.

== Reception ==
=== Critical response ===
The review aggregation website Rotten Tomatoes gives the film a score of 90% based on 137 reviews from critics, with a weighted average of 8.2/10. The website's consensus reads, "Downfall is an illuminating, thoughtful and detailed account of Hitler's last days." On Metacritic, the film was awarded the Must-See badge, holding a weighted average of 82 out of 100 based on 35 reviews, indicating "universal acclaim".

Reviews for the film were often very positive, despite debate surrounding the film from critics and audiences upon its release. Ganz's portrayal of Hitler was singled out for praise; David Denby for The New Yorker said that Ganz "made the dictator into a plausible human being". With respect to German uneasiness about humanizing Hitler, Denby said that while;

journalists in [Germany] wondered aloud whether the 'human' treatment of Hitler might not inadvertently aid the neo-Nazi movement...in his many rants in [the film] Hitler says that the German people do not deserve to survive, that they have failed him by losing the war and must perish – not exactly the sentiments [...] that would spark a recruitment drive. This Hitler may be human, but he's as utterly degraded a human being as has ever been shown on the screen, a man whose every impulse leads to annihilation [...].

Addressing other critics like Denby, Chicago Sun-Times critic Roger Ebert said the film did not provide an adequate portrayal of Hitler's actions, because he felt no film could, and that no response would be sufficient. Ebert said Hitler was, in reality, "the focus for a spontaneous uprising by many of the German people, fueled by racism, xenophobia, grandiosity and fear".

Hermann Graml, history professor and former Luftwaffe helper, praised the film and said that he had not seen a film that "brings the past to life in such a powerful and agonizing way". Graml said that Hitler's portrayal was presented correctly by showing Hitler's will "to destroy, and his way of denying reality". Julia Radke of the German website Future Needs Remembrance praised the film's acting and called it well crafted and a solid Kammerspielfilm ('chamber feature film'), though it could lose viewer interest due to a lack of concentration on the narrative perspective. German author Jens Jessen said that the film "could have been stupider" and called it a "chamber play that could not be staged undramatically". Jessen also said that it was not as spectacular as the pre-media coverage could have led one to believe, and it did not arouse the "morbid fascination" the magazine Der Spiegel was looking for.

Hitler biographer Ian Kershaw wrote in The Guardian that the film had enormous emotive power, calling it a triumph and "a marvellous historical drama". Kershaw also said that he "found it hard to imagine that anyone (other than the usual neo-Nazi fringe) could possibly find Hitler a sympathetic figure" in his final days, noting how Hitler "could be kind and considerate to his secretaries, and with the next breath show cold ruthlessness, dispassionate brutality, in determining the deaths of millions". He also praised Ganz's performance, stating that compared to actors who played Hitler beforehand, such as Alec Guinness or Anthony Hopkins, "this is the only one which to me is compelling. Part of this is the voice. Ganz has Hitler's voice to near perfection. It is chillingly authentic". Wim Wenders, in a review for the German newspaper Die Zeit, said the film was absent of a strong point of view for Hitler which made him harmless, and compared Downfall to Resident Evil: Apocalypse, stating that in Resident Evil the viewer would know which character was evil.

Alex von Tunzelmann of The Guardian gave the film a grade of A, saying: "Downfall is an intelligent, thoroughly researched recreation of Hitler's last days, and a terrific movie."

Tom Fordy praised the film as an achievement.

=== Humanization concerns ===
They just got it wrong. Bad people do not walk around with claws like vicious monsters, even though it might be comforting to think so.

— Hirschbiegel in 2015, on the criticism surrounding the portrayal of Hitler

Downfall was the subject of dispute by critics and audiences in Germany before and after its release, with many concerned regarding Hitler's portrayal in the film in spite of his actions and ideologies. The portrayal sparked debate in Germany due to publicity from commentators, film magazines, and newspapers, leading the German tabloid Bild to ask the question, "Are we allowed to show the monster as a human being?"

Russian press visited the set, making the producers uneasy and occasionally defensive. Yana Bezhanskay, director of Globus Film, Constantin's Russian partner, raised her voice to Russian journalists and said: "This is an antifascist film and nowhere in it do you see Hitler praised."

Cristina Nord from Die Tageszeitung criticized the portrayal, and said that though it was important to make films about perpetrators, "seeing Hitler cry" had not informed her on the last days of the Third Reich. Some have supported the film: Hans-Jürgen Syberberg, director of Hitler: A Film from Germany (1977), felt the time was right to "paint a realistic portrait" of Hitler. Ganz said that he was proud of the film; though he said people had accused him of humanizing Hitler.

== Historical accuracy ==
The basic premises of the film are true and largely accurate. While the majority of the characters in the film are based on actual people, the character Peter Kranz is not, though based on Alfred Zech, a 12-year-old who saved a dozen German soldiers from a Russian attack in his home village of Goldenau (now Złotniki, Poland). Author Giles MacDonogh criticized the portrayals of SS officers Wilhelm Mohnke and Ernst-Günther Schenck as being sympathetic, noting that Mohnke was accused of murdering a group of British prisoners of war in the Wormhoudt massacre. (Note: Mohnke was rumoured, but never proven, to have ordered the execution near Dunkirk in 1940. He strongly denied the accusations against him, and told historian Thomas Fischer that he never issued any orders to take or execute English prisoners.) Hirschbiegel has said in interviews that these allegations, as well as allegations that Schenck had performed unethical medical experiments, were unproven.

When Rochus Misch, Hitler's bodyguard, was asked about the film's historical accuracy in a 2005 interview, he stated that although it was factually accurate, the film was "Americanized", claiming that Hitler never screamed in the bunker and that the bunker was generally quiet, although Hitler's furious rant about Steiner's failure to attack was recorded by eyewitnesses. According to Misch, Magda Goebbels insisted that her children stay in the bunker and made the decision that they should be killed when she and her husband committed suicide, as opposed to the couple making the decision together, as depicted in the film. Bunker nurse Erna Flegel commended the film, stating that although it got some minor details wrong, it was generally accurate.

== Parodies ==
The scene depicting Hitler's angry tirade, after his orders were not carried out, became a viral video after numerous parodies were posted to the internet.

Downfall is well known for its rise in popularity due to many internet parody videos and memes which use several scenes in the film: when Hitler phones General der Flieger Karl Koller about Berlin's April 20 bombardment; when Hitler discusses a counterattack against advancing Soviet forces with his generals; where Hitler becomes angry after hearing that Steiner's attack never happened, due to a lack of forces; when Hitler hears Luftwaffe commander Hermann Göring's telegram; when Hitler is having dinner and discovers Reichsführer-SS Heinrich Himmler secretly made a surrender offer to the Western Allies; and where Hitler orders Otto Günsche to find SS-Gruppenführer Hermann Fegelein.

In these videos, the original German audio is retained, but new subtitles are added so that Hitler and his subordinates seem to be reacting to an issue or setback in present-day politics, sports, entertainment, popular culture, or everyday life. In addition, some users combine footage from the film with other sources, dub the German dialogue over video games and/or footage from other films and TV series, or edit images of the characters onto pre-existing or animated footage, often for greater comic effect.

Hirschbiegel spoke positively about these parodies in a 2010 interview with New York magazine, saying that many of them were funny and a fitting extension of the film's purpose. Nevertheless, Constantin Film asked video sites to remove them. The producers initiated a removal of parody videos from YouTube in 2010. This prompted more posting of parody videos of Hitler complaining that the parodies were being taken down, and a resurgence of the videos on the site.

One particular parody was the subject of BP Refinery v Tracey, in Australia, where a BP employee named Scott Tracey was terminated from his job for a video satirising collective bargaining negotiations at the company he was working in. Tracey managed to successfully appeal his unfair dismissal to the Full Federal Court who decided that the video in question was not offensive, and had his job reinstated and received A$200,000 in compensation, equivalent to A$219,300 in 2022.

The 2012 science fiction comedy Iron Sky and the 2015 political satire film Look Who's Back both parody the scene of Hitler finding out Steiner's attack did not take place; Nazis are a central plot point in both films.

== See also ==
- Adolf Hitler in popular culture
- The Bunker (1981 film) – American television film
- Vorbunker – Adolf Hitler's air raid shelter
