= Jaśkowice =

Jaśkowice may refer to the following places:

- Jaśkowice, Lesser Poland Voivodeship (south Poland)
- Jaśkowice, Kluczbork County in Opole Voivodeship (south-west Poland)
- Jaśkowice, Gmina Prószków, Opole County in Opole Voivodeship (south-west Poland)
- Jaśkowice, Silesian Voivodeship (south Poland)
