= Boguszyce, Opole Voivodeship =

Boguszyce Boguschütz
- Village
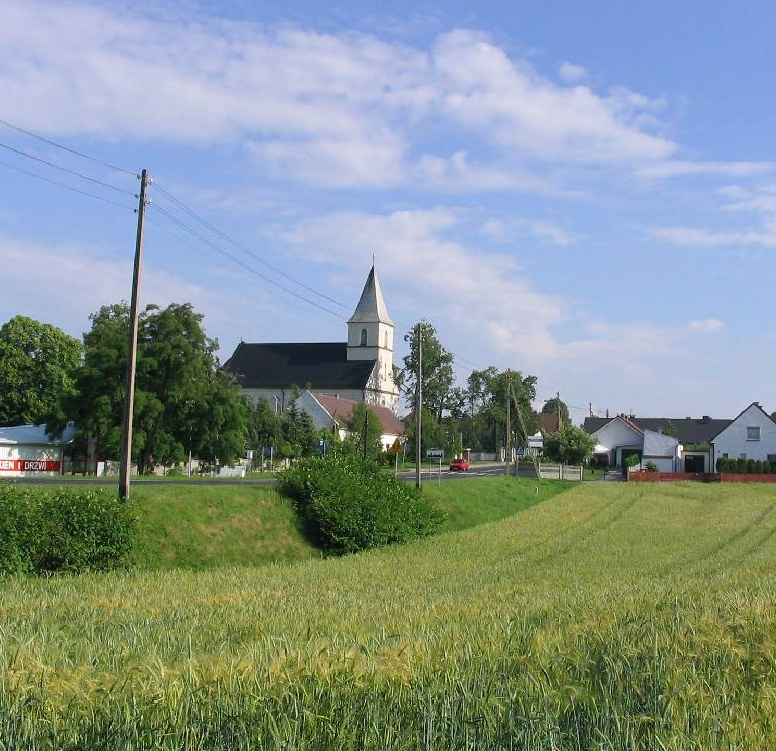
- Church of Holy Trinity

- Location within Poland
- Coordinates: 50°36′N 17°56′E
- Country: Poland
- Voivodeship: Opole
- County: Opole
- Gmina: Prószków
- Time zone: UTC+1 (CET)
  - Summer (DST): UTC+2 (CEST)
- Vehicle registration: OPO

Boguszyce ([bɔɡuˈʂɨt͡sɛ], additional name in German: Boguschütz) is a village in the administrative district of Gmina Prószków, within Opole County, Opole Voivodeship, in south-western Poland.
