= Inside Hitler's Bunker =

2002 book by Joachim Fest

Inside Hitler's Bunker: The Last Days of the Third Reich
- Author: Joachim Fest
- Language: German
- Subject: Adolf Hitler
- Published: 2002
- Publication place: Germany

Inside Hitler's Bunker: The Last Days of the Third Reich (German: Der Untergang: Hitler und das Ende des Dritten Reiches) is a book by historian Joachim Fest about the last days of the life of Adolf Hitler, in his Berlin Führerbunker in 1945.

The book was originally published in Germany in 2002. The English translation was released in 2004. The book formed source material for the 2004 German film Der Untergang (Downfall) in 2004.

== Publications ==
- Original German version: Fest, Joachim (2002). Der Untergang: Hitler und das Ende des Dritten Reiches; eine historische Skizze. Berlin: Alexander Fest Verlag. ISBN 978-3-8286-0172-7.
- First US version: Fest, Joachim (2004). Inside Hitler's Bunker: The Last Days of the Third Reich. New York: Farrar, Straus, and Giroux. ISBN 978-0-374-13577-5.

== See also ==
- List of Adolf Hitler books
