= Gmina Prószków =

Gmina Prószków Gemeinde Proskau Prószków Commune
- Gmina
- Coat of arms
- Interactive map of Gmina Prószków
- Coordinates (Prószków): 50°34′35″N 17°52′17″E
- Country: Poland
- Voivodeship: Opole
- County: Opole
- Seat: Prószków

Area
  - Total: 121.23 km^{2} (46.81 sq mi)

Population (2019-06-30)
  - Total: 9,029
  - Density: 74.48/km^{2} (192.9/sq mi)
  - Urban: 2,570
  - Rural: 6,459
- Time zone: UTC+1 (CET)
  - Summer (DST): UTC+2 (CEST)
- Vehicle registration: OPO
- Website: http://www.proszkow.pl

Gmina Prószków (German: Gemeinde Proskau) is an urban-rural gmina (administrative district) in Opole County, Opole Voivodeship, in south-western Poland. Its seat is the town of Prószków, which lies approximately 11 kilometres (7 mi) south-west of the regional capital Opole.

The gmina covers an area of 121.23 square kilometres (46.8 sq mi), and as of 2019 its total population was 9,029. Since 2006, the commune, like most of the area, has been bilingual in Polish and German, a substantial German population having remained after World War II.

== Villages ==
The commune contains the villages and settlements of:

- Prószków
- Boguszyce
- Chrząszczyce
- Chrzowice
- Folwark
- Górki
- Jaśkowice
- Ligota Prószkowska
- Nowa Kuźnia
- Przysiecz
- Zimnice Małe
- Zimnice Wielkie
- Źlinice
- Złotniki

== Neighbouring gminas ==
Gmina Prószków is bordered by the city of Opole and by the gminas of Biała, Komprachcice, Korfantów, Strzeleczki, Tarnów Opolski and Tułowice.

== Twin towns – sister cities ==
Gmina Prószków is twinned with:

- Hünfeld, Germany
- Ternberg, Austria
- Pruszków, Poland
