= Zimnice Małe =

Zimnice Małe Klein Schimnitz
- Village
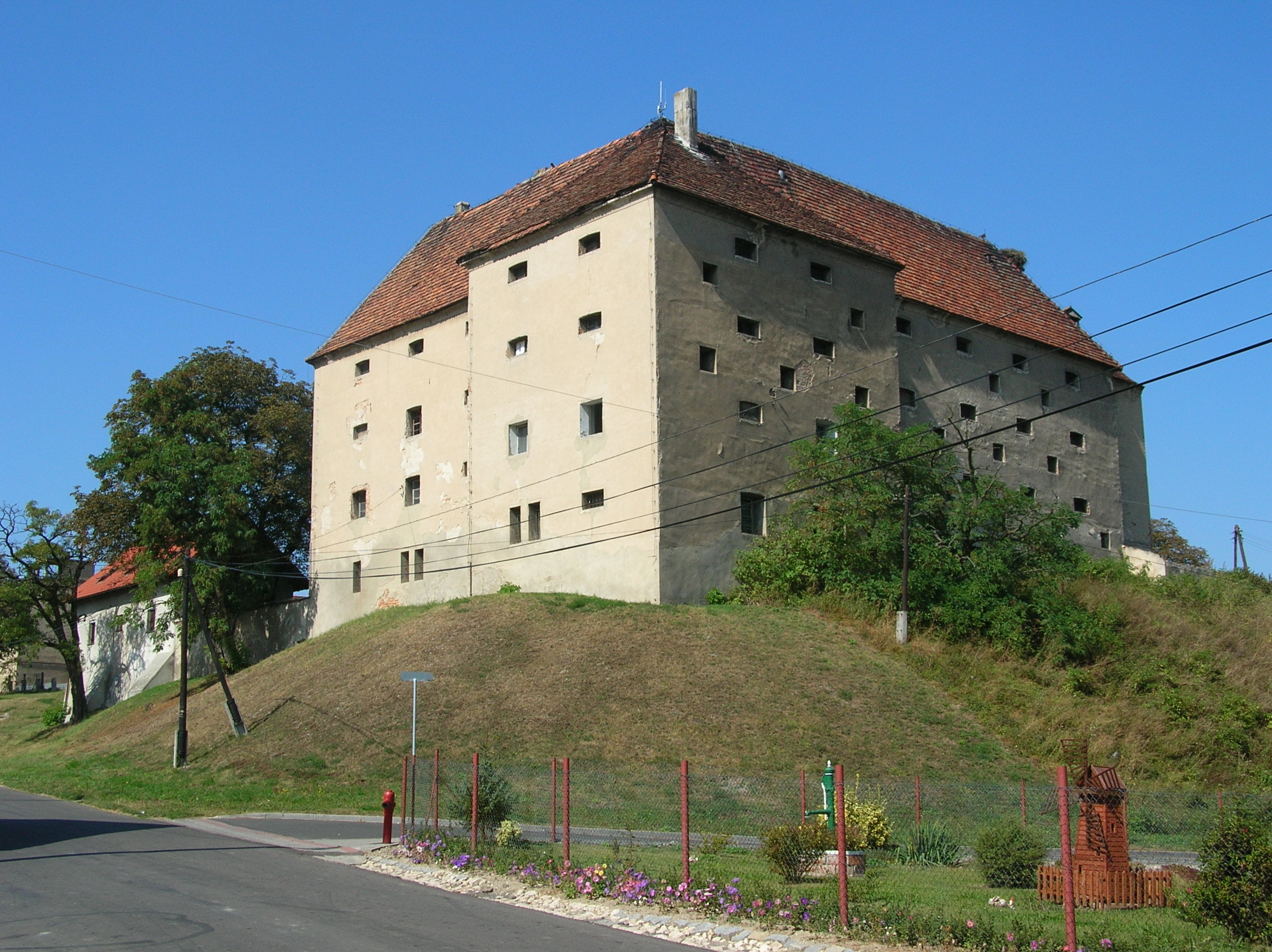
- Old castle rebuilt to granary

- Location within Poland
- Coordinates: 50°34′10″N 17°56′42″E
- Country: Poland
- Voivodeship: Opole
- County: Opole
- Gmina: Prószków
- Time zone: UTC+1 (CET)
  - Summer (DST): UTC+2 (CEST)
- Vehicle registration: OPO

Zimnice Małe ([ʑimˈnit͡sɛ ˈmawɛ], additional name in German: Klein Schimnitz) is a village in the administrative district of Gmina Prószków, within Opole County, Opole Voivodeship, in south-western Poland.
