= Alfred Zech =

German child soldier (1932–2011)

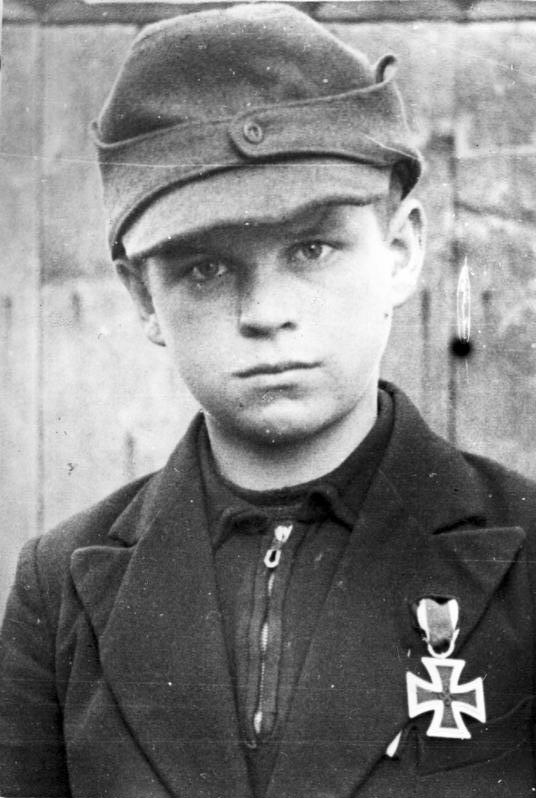
- Zech in 1945
- Born: 12 October 1932; Zlattnik, Upper Silesia, Prussia, Germany (now Złotniki, Poland)
- Died: 13 June 2011 (aged 78); Hückelhoven, North Rhine-Westphalia, Germany
- Other name: Alfred Czech
- Known for: Child soldier
- Political party: Polish United Workers'
- Awards: Iron Cross, 2nd Class
- Military career
- Allegiance: Germany
- Branch: Hitler Youth
- Service years: 1945
- Conflicts: World War II

Alfred Zech, born as Alfred Czech (12 October 1932 – 13 June 2011), was a German child soldier who received the Iron Cross, 2nd Class at the age of 12 years.

== Early life and military career ==
Zech was born in Zlattnik, Upper Silesia (present-day Złotniki, Opole Voivodeship, Poland) and was enrolled in the Deutsches Jungvolk, as was mandatory at the time. In early 1945, Goldenau (as Zlattnik was re-named in a campaign to Germanise Silesia from 1936–1945) was under attack by advancing elements of the Soviet Red Army. During the attack, Zech saw a number of German soldiers injured by mortar fire, and decided to use his father's farm cart to retrieve them. He made two trips, bringing a dozen wounded to his family home.

According to Zech, a German general appeared at the family farm several days later and asked the parents to send the boy to Berlin for an audience with Adolf Hitler. His father agreed and Zech joined several other Jungvolk child soldiers who were decorated by Hitler with Iron Crosses (2nd class) for bravery. The recording of the ceremony was widely circulated in German propaganda material. A photograph of Zech being inspected by Hitler was captured by Büro Laux, a German Foreign Ministry photo agency, and later – via Pressens Bild – distributed to the Associated Press.

At the subsequent banquet, Zech stated that he volunteered to remain in service, unaware that his home village was already captured and his father had been killed in action after he was pressed into the Volkssturm. Zech was sent to the front in Freudenthal (present-day Czech Silesia). There he was wounded in combat and captured. After his release in 1947, he returned home, learning about his father's death upon arrival.

== Later life ==
As an adult, Zech joined the Polish United Workers' Party in order to receive leave to emigrate. In 1964, he settled in West Germany where he worked as a laborer.

== Personal life ==
Zech was married and had ten children.

== In popular culture ==
In the German epic historical war drama film Downfall, the character of Peter Kranz is based on Zech, a member of the Hitler Youth during the last stages of the war.

== See also ==
- 12th SS Panzer Division Hitlerjugend
- Armin D. Lehmann
