= Prószków =

Town in Opole Voivodeship, Poland

Prószków Proskau
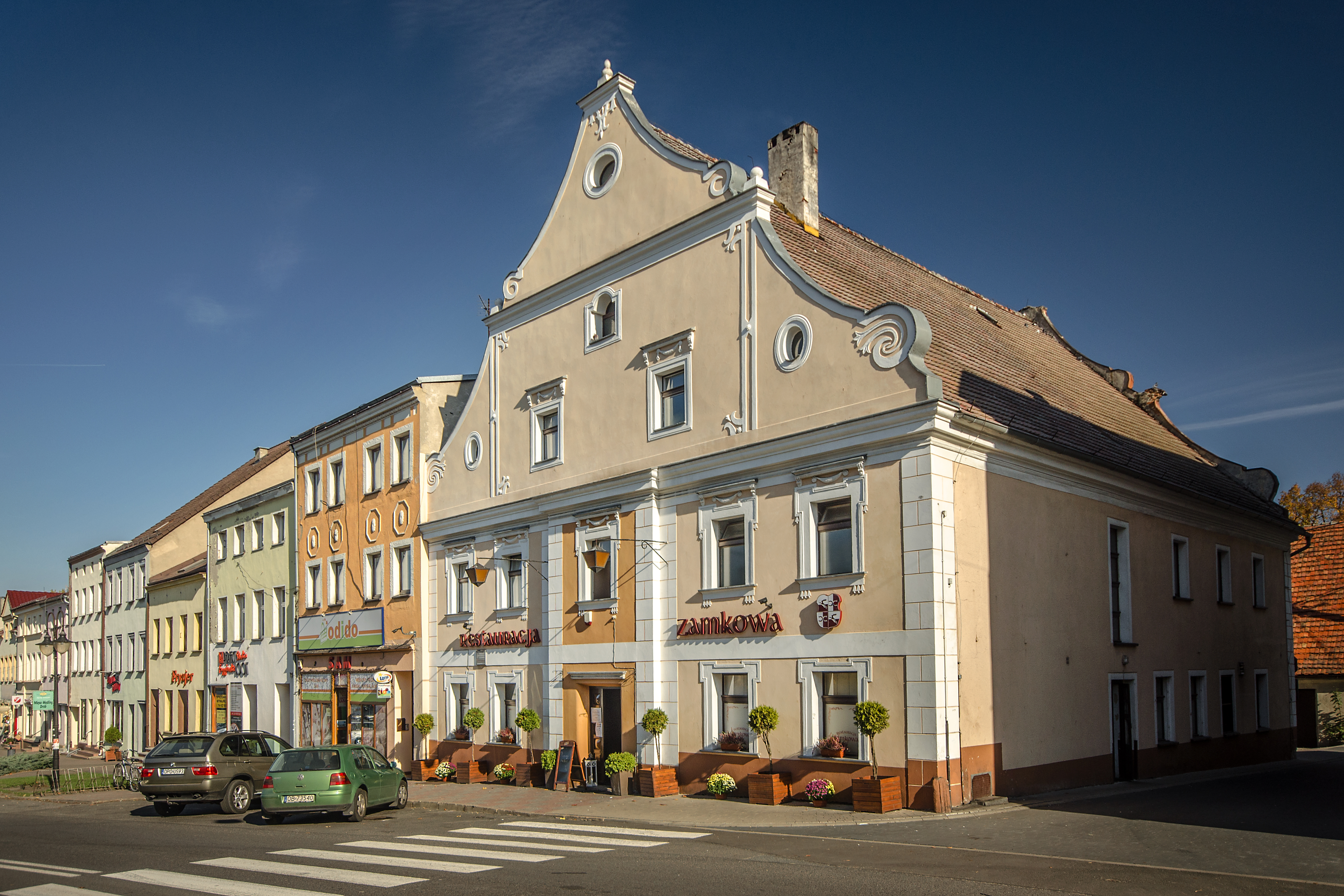
- Historic townhouses at the Market Square

- Flag Coat of arms

- Location within Poland
- Coordinates: 50°34′35″N 17°52′17″E
- Country: Poland
- Voivodeship: Opole
- County: Opole
- Gmina: Prószków
- First mentioned: 1250

Area
  - Total: 16.31 km^{2} (6.30 sq mi)

Population (2019-06-30)
  - Total: 2,570
  - Density: 158/km^{2} (408/sq mi)
- Time zone: UTC+1 (CET)
  - Summer (DST): UTC+2 (CEST)
- Postal code: 46-060
- Vehicle registration: OPO
- Website: http://www.proszkow.pl/

Prószków ([ˈpruʂkuf], German: Proskau; Silesian: Prōszkow) is a town in Opole County, Opole Voivodeship in southern Poland. It is the administrative seat of Gmina Prószków.

Founded in the Middle Ages, Prószków features a landmark Baroque castle, and was once known for faience manufacturing and pomological research. For over 100 years (from 1921 to 2026), Prószków held the record for the highest temperature ever recorded in Poland.

== Geography ==
The town is located in the historic Upper Silesia region, about 10 km (6.2 mi) south of Opole. As of 2019 it has 2,570 inhabitants.

On July 29, 1921, a temperature of 40.2 °C (104 °F) was recorded in the city. It was the highest temperature ever recorded in any city located in present-day Poland (the town was then a part of Germany) until June 28th, 2026, when the record was beaten at least twice.

== History ==
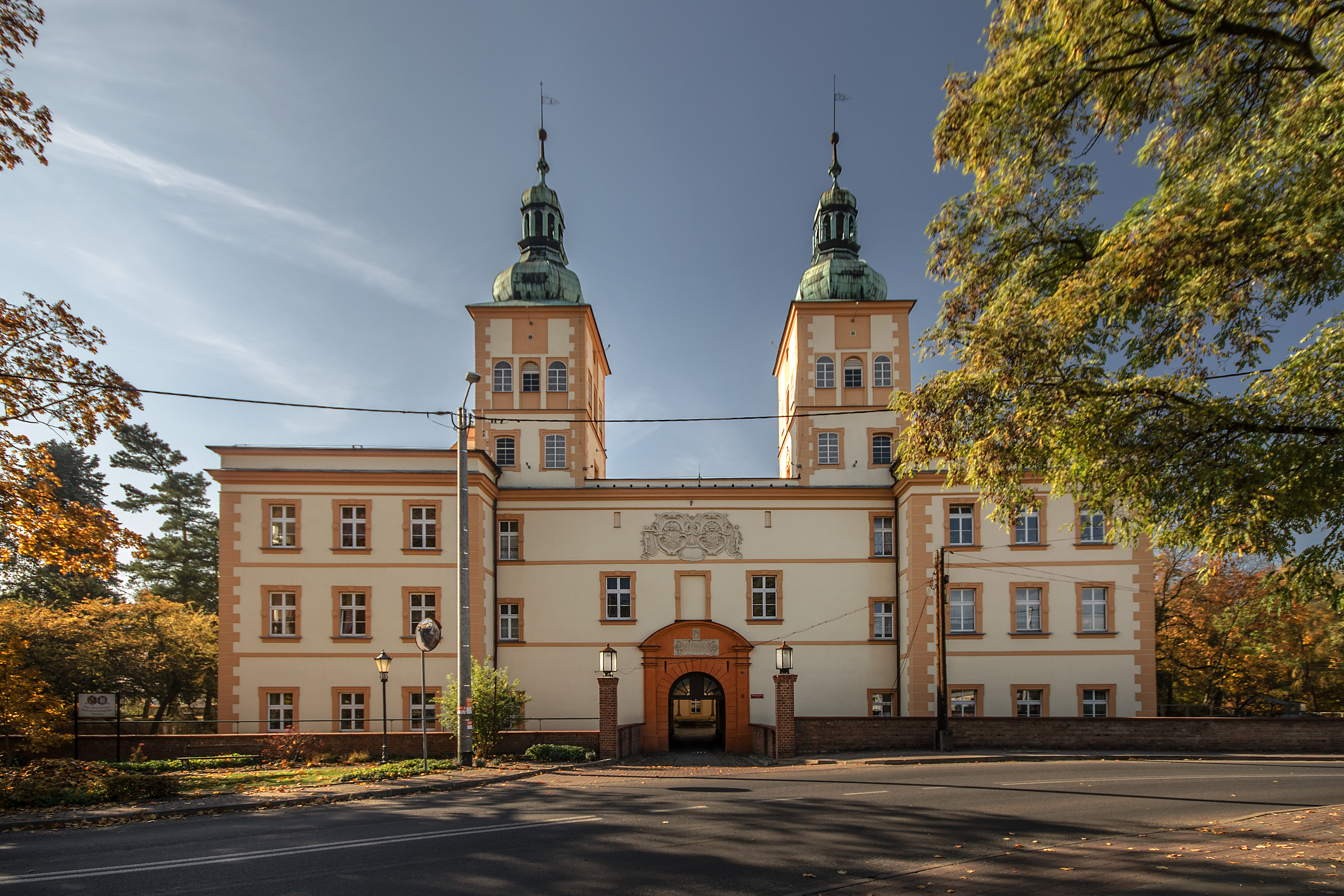
Pruszków Castle

Prószków in the Silesian Duchy of Opole of fragmented Poland was first mentioned in a 1250 deed. From the 14th century onwards the estates were held by the Prószkowski (also known as Pruskowski, Pruskovsky, von Proskau) noble family. In fact, the noble family's surname is after the name of the town. Count George von Proskau had the parish church and a Renaissance castle built in the late 16th century, which both were set ablaze by Swedish troops during the Thirty Years' War and had to be rebuilt in their present Baroque style after the war.

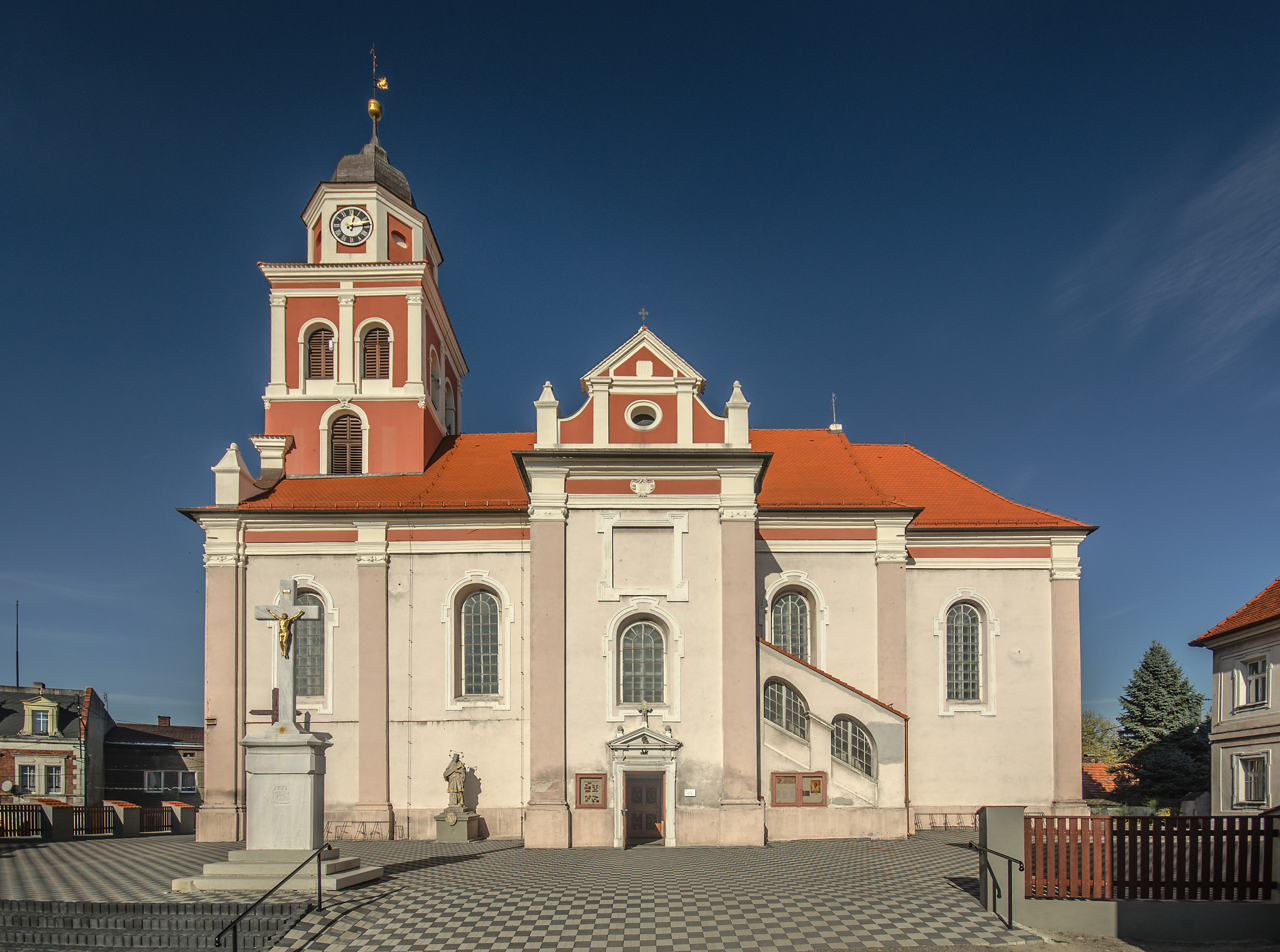
Baroque Saint George Church

After the First Silesian War the town passed from Bohemian sovereignty and became part of Prussia in 1742 under the Germanized name Proskau. From 1763 the castle housed a famous faience manufacture, founded by count Leopold Prószkowski. The faience was sold mainly throughout Prussia, Poland and Austria. After the death of Count Leopold von Proskau in 1769 his estate (including the manufacture) passed to Karl Maximilian, Prince of Dietrichstein, which moved its most valuable collections, including the library, treasury and archive, to another location in then Austria in 1782, and eventually sold the estate to the Prussian king Frederick the Great in 1783. Part of the collection was found in 2011 in Brno and Mikulov in the Czech Republic. From 1871 to 1945 the town was part of Germany. From 1847 the castle was used as an agronomic college. Many Poles attended the college, and a Polish library and the Literary and Agricultural Society of Polish Students were founded in 1856 and 1860, respectively. The college was relocated to Berlin in 1881. The succeeding institute for pomological research, founded in 1868, including an arboretum and extensive orchards, exists up to today. Polish students of both schools operated a secret resistance organization to provide Polish patriotic education to the local population and prevent its Germanization.

After World War II only parts of the German population were expelled in accordance with the Potsdam Agreement. Prószków regained a town charter in 2004. Since 2006, German has been an officially recognized additional auxiliary language.

The coat of arms of the town is after that of the Prószkowski family.

== Transport ==
The Polish A4 motorway and Voivodeship roads 414 and 429 run through Prószków.

== Twin towns – sister cities ==
See twin towns of Gmina Prószków.
