= BP Refinery v Tracey =

2020 case in the Federal Court of Australia

- Court: Full Court of the Federal Court
- Full case name: BP Refinery (Kwinana) Pty Ltd v Tracey
- Citation: [2020] FCAFC 89

Case history
- Prior actions: Scott Tracey v BP Refinery (Kwinana) Pty Ltd [2019] FWC 4113; Scott Tracey v BP Refinery (Kwinana) Pty Ltd [2020] FWCFB 820;
- Appealed from: Full Bench of the Fair Work Commission
- Appealed to: Full Court of the Federal Court
- Subsequent action: Scott Tracey v BP Refinery (Kwinana) Pty Ltd [2020] FWCFB 4206

Court membership
- Judges sitting: Besanko, Perram, and Jagot JJ

BP Refinery v Tracey [2020] FCAFC 89 was a decision by the Full Federal Court of Australia ruling that the rejection of an application for unfair dismissal had been decided incorrectly by the Fair Work Commission (FWC). BP employee Scott Tracey had been terminated following his involvement in the production and circulation of a parodic video. A scene from the 2004 film Downfall was at the time widely used on the internet to parody various events. Tracey distributed a video using this footage to depict BP management, mocking their behaviour during negotiations on pay and conditions for employees at the Kwinana Oil Refinery.

Following his termination, Tracey applied for unfair dismissal seeking reinstatement and compensation for lost salary. His application was dismissed after the FWC held the video was sufficiently offensive to constitute a valid reason for dismissal. Tracey appealed to the Full Bench of the FWC, which overturned the initial decision. BP then sought an order from the Full Federal Court to quash the fresh decision. The Full Federal Court rejected arguments made by BP, concluding the Full Bench of the FWC correctly applied its jurisdiction and that the video was not offensive. Tracey was eventually reinstated to his position and received $200,000 in compensation.

== Background ==
Scott Tracey was an employee at BP's Kwinana Oil Refinery. During his employment, he and other employees were engaged in collective bargaining, a process of negotiation between employees and an employer aimed at forming an agreement to regulate pay and working conditions. The discussions for this agreement saw tough tactics used by both sides. In order to push workers onto the underlying industrial award, BP sought to cancel the current agreement. The union and its members engaged took industrial action which was terminated by the FWC.

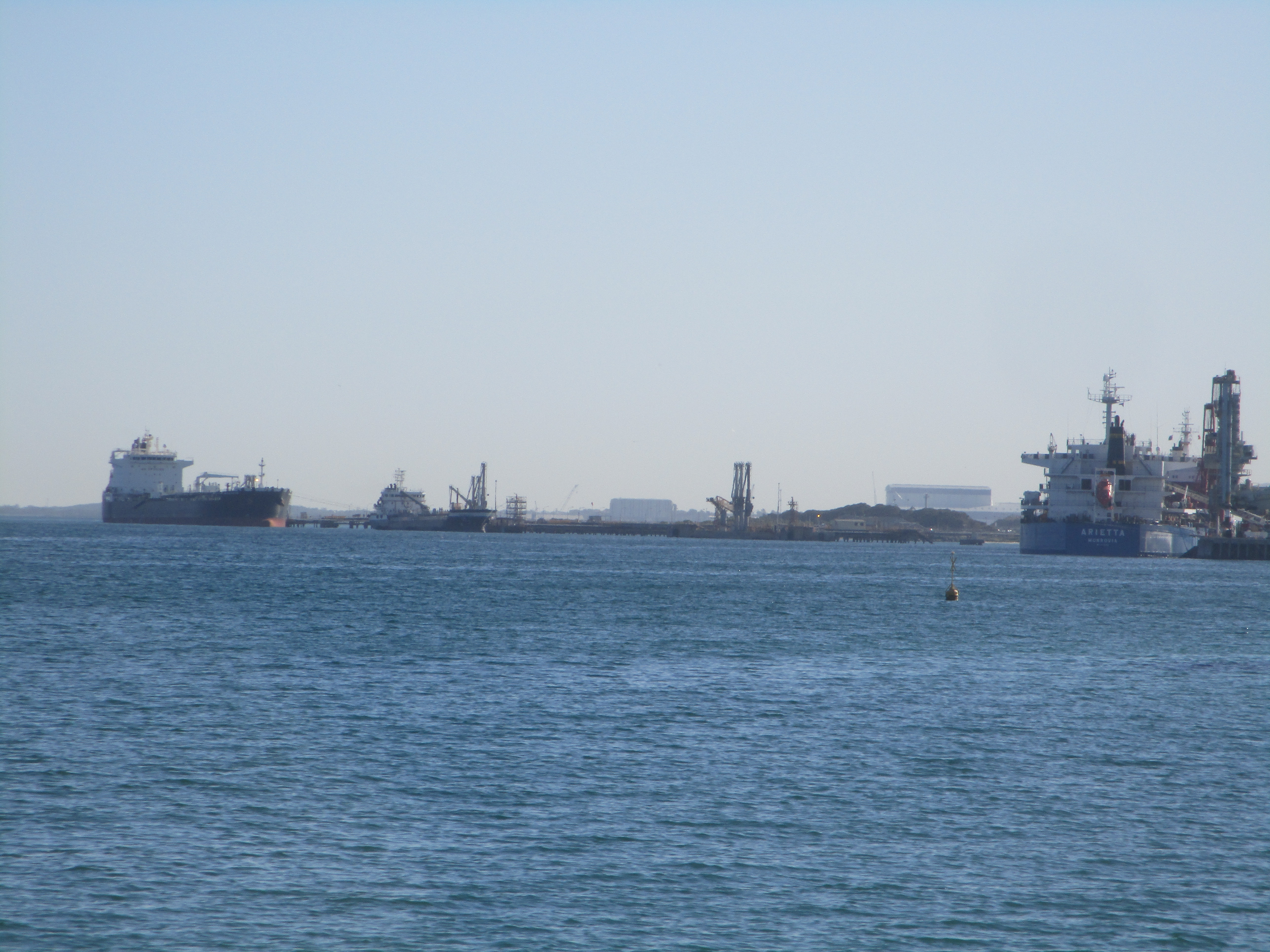
BP's Kwinana Oil Refinery

In the midst of bargaining, Tracey participated in the production of a video which depicted BP management as Nazis. The video showed a scene from the movie Downfall, in which Adolf Hitler acts upset and belligerent when he is notified that his regime has lost World War II. This specific scene had become commonly used on the internet for parodic purposes. Referred to by some as the "Downfall Hitler meme", individuals utilise the scene where Hitler breaks down and then add English subtitles different to the spoken German words to create a video intended to be humorous. Tracey's video was posted in a Facebook group with the title: "Hitler Parody [collective bargaining] Negotiations not going [BP's] way". The video included parodic captions such as "I offered the carrot, I tried using the stick...Don't they know I'm in charge?" and "I made promises to London".

BP management responded to the video by commencing an investigation, directing him not to attend work until further notice. The investigation was completed, with Tracey then invited to attend a meeting where he was required to demonstrate why he should not face disciplinary action for his conduct. During the meeting, Tracey objected to the investigation process and its findings. Approximately a month later, Tracey's employment was terminated with salary paid in lieu of notice. BP's reason for termination was that Tracey had distributed highly offensive and inappropriate material in breach of its code of conduct, policies, and permitted use of information technology equipment.

== Legal proceedings ==
Tracey made an application for unfair dismissal to the Fair Work Commission (FWC). Unfair dismissal in Australian labour law refers to a termination of employment which an employee alleges is "harsh, unjust, or unfair". In the first instance, deputy president Melanie Binet rejected his claim that he was unfairly dismissed. Binet held that it was not unreasonable to find that Tracey, in helping to make the video, had likened BP management to Hitler, Nazis or mass murderers. She considered the video inappropriate and offensive, and that BP had a valid reason for his subsequent dismissal. Binet stated that she "did not accept that by labelling something as a parody [one would get] a 'get out of jail free card' and necessarily means something is not offensive".

=== Appeal by Tracey to the Full Bench of the FWC ===
In lodging an appeal to the Full Bench of the FWC against the initial decision, Tracey was represented by plaintiff law firm Maurice Blackburn. His legal representative told the Australian Financial Review it "[would submit] that the dismissal is incredibly harsh when [considering] the true nature and effect of the video, which is a well-known Downfall parody video...I don't think it could be reasonably considered that the video likens any BP managers or staff to Hitler or Nazis, but ultimately this will be a decision for the full bench of the [FWC]".

The primary issue in dispute was whether Tracey's actions constituted a valid reason for dismissal. Tracey argued that in failing to understand the video in its broader cultural context, Binet had erroneously mischaracterised it as offensive and that it was a "device to make a humorous point about a matter not going to plan". Vice president of the FWC Adam Hatcher stated thousands of similar parodies had been posted to the internet since the meme hit its peak in 2010, and the Full Bench would apply an objective test to determine the offensiveness of the video.

The Full Bench of the FWC overturned the first decision, finding the video compared the position BP reached in the negotiations with that which the Nazi regime was faced at the end of World War II, observing that the meme was "culturally dissociat[ed]" from real events and that it has been used "thousands of times over a period of more than a decade for the purpose of creating, in an entirely inventive way, a satirical depiction of contemporary situations". The Full Bench of the FWC concluded that it was unreasonable to find the video likened BP management to Nazis, stating "anyone with knowledge of the meme could not seriously consider that the use of the clip was to make some point involving Hitler or Nazis".

=== Appeal by BP to the Full Federal Court ===
BP then applied to the Full Federal Court seeking a writ of certiorari – effectively requesting it quash the decision made by the Full Bench of the FWC on the grounds its decision was contrary to law. First, BP argued the Full Bench of the FWC erred in applying its discretion in not applying a test which required Binet's decision to be "fundamentally wrong and not reasonably open on the facts, rather than just a decision that the appellate court would itself not have reached on an evaluation of the evidence". Second, BP claimed that the Full Bench of the FWC had neglected to evaluate whether there was a major error of fact and that the issue of whether Tracey's behaviour breached the relevant BP Code of Conduct was one of fact. The Full Federal Court dismissed BP's claims and instead upheld the decision made by the Full Bench of the FWC. The Full Federal Court ordered Tracey's reinstatement, and he returned to work in March 2020.

=== Compensation ===
After being returned to work, compensation for the work he had missed between his termination and subsequent reinstatement was the only outstanding issue. Almost two years after Tracey lodged his initial unfair dismissal application, Tracey was awarded compensation by the Full Bench of the FWC. BP argued Tracey should receive less than the salary he otherwise would have earned during this time due to his misconduct. BP also claimed his payment should be reduced because he ought to have found other work during the time he awaited an outcome. Tracey argued he had looked for work, which the Full Bench of the FWC accepted. It was also held his misconduct could only justify withholding any money he may have earned from potential promotion during his absence. The Full Bench of the FWC ordered Tracey be paid a total of $201,394.92 in lost wages and retirement benefits. The Australian Workers Union said Tracey's win was a "victory for workers rights...and Aussie larrikinism".

== Impact ==
The decision by the Full Federal Court to overturn Binet's decision was praised as one of few legal decisions in recent times to "put a handbrake on the increasing levels of employer control over employee conduct" and their right to free speech. The Sydney Morning Herald opined the decision indirectly boosts the right of employees in the workplace to free speech, though conceded such rights are limited and the scope of free speech required exploring by future cases.

The proceedings surrounding Tracey's dismissal by BP spawned another version of the Downfall meme, parodying the initial decision by Binet, mocking her interpretation of Tracey's video. It eventually attracted more views than the video produced by Tracey.

== Bibliography ==
Source videos

- Tracey, Scott (3 September 2018). "Hitler Parody EA Negotiations". Caption Generator.
- "Hitler reacts to Downfall meme sacking". Caption Generator. 5 September 2019.

Academic literature

- Hansen, Grant (2020). "Employment: Taking the mickey at work - could it be your downfall?". Law Society of NSW Journal (70): 80–81 – via InfoRMIT.
- Hor, Joydeep (2009). Managing termination of employment (2 ed.). Sydney: CCH Australia. ISBN 978-1-921485-96-1. OCLC 310335234.
- Schwabach, Aaron (2012). "Reclaiming copyright from the outside in: What the Downfall Hitler meme means for transformative works, fair use, and parody". Buffalo Intellectual Property Law Journal. 8 (1): 1–25.

News articles

- "Downfall: BP refinery worker sacked over Hitler parody wins job back". BBC News. 28 February 2020.
- Bonyhady, Nick (22 May 2020a). "BP worker wins after Hitler meme case goes all the way to Federal Court". The Sydney Morning Herald.
- Bonyhady, Nick (10 August 2020b). "Scott was fired over a Hitler meme. Now his boss has to pay him $200,000". The Sydney Morning Herald.
- Forsyth, Anthony (6 March 2020). "BP decision struck a blow for employees' right of free speech". The Sydney Morning Herald.
- Marin-Guzman, David (4 September 2019). "BP sacking upheld for sharing of a Hitler parody video". Australian Financial Review.
- Marin-Guzman, David (26 September 2020). "Downfall meme sacking appealed to full bench". Australian Financial Review.
- McGowan, Michael (11 August 2020). "Downfall: BP worker sacked for Hitler meme wins $200,000 in compensation". The Guardian.
- McKeever, Vicky (11 August 2020). "BP worker gets $200,000 payout after being fired for Hitler meme". CNBC.
- Patty, Anna (14 November 2019). "Sacked BP worker argues Fair Work failed to get his 'Hitler Downfall' joke". The Sydney Morning Herald.
- Sang, Lucia (28 February 2020). "Australian BP refinery worker wins job back after parodying company with popular Hitler meme". Fox News.
- Zhou, Naaman (15 November 2019). "BP worker fired over Downfall video appeals, saying Fair Work did not understand meme". The Guardian.
