= Nowa Kuźnia, Opole Voivodeship =

Nowa Kuźnia Neuhammer
- Village
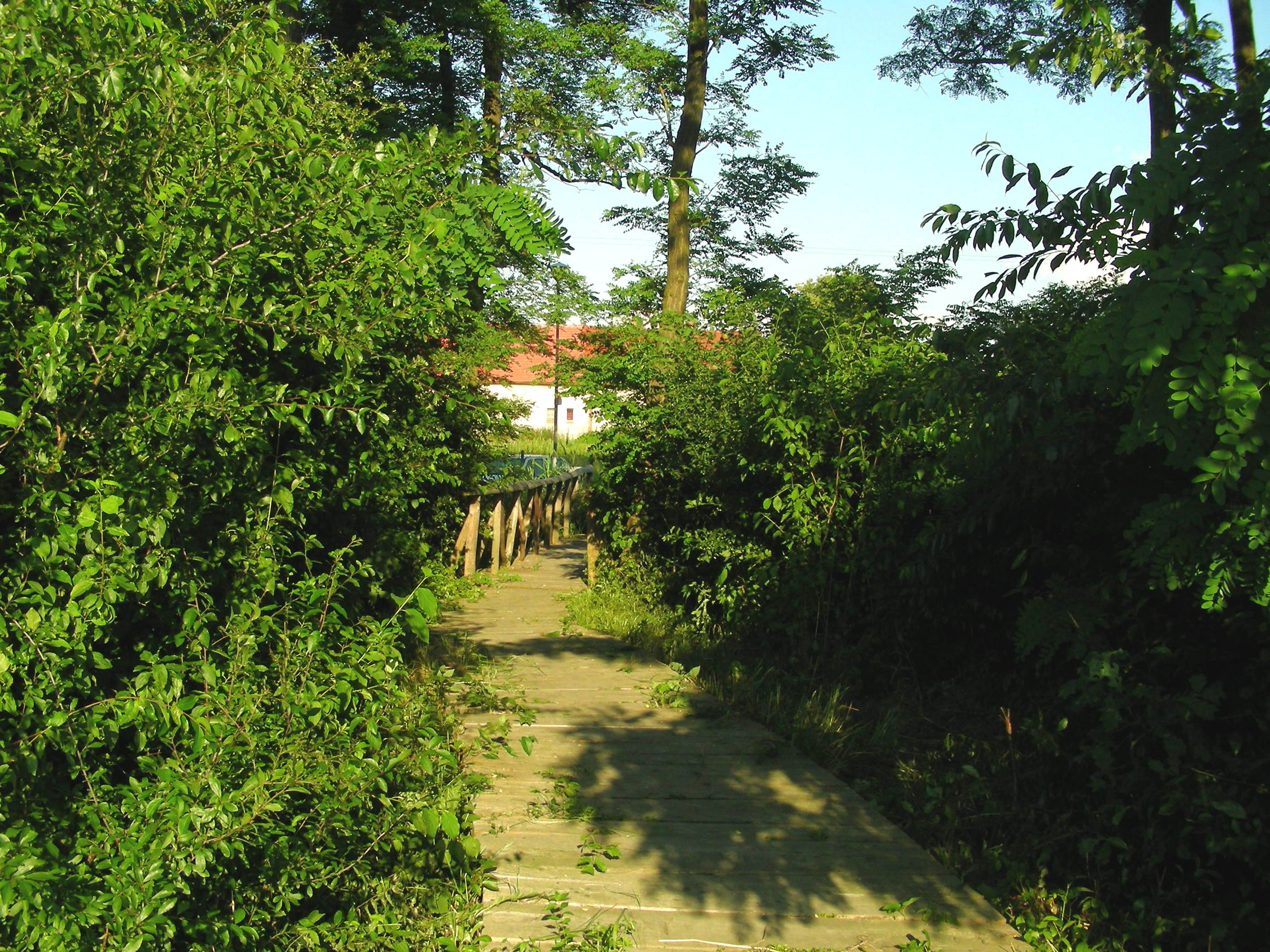
- Nature reserve

- Location within Poland
- Coordinates: 50°36′10″N 17°51′53″E
- Country: Poland
- Voivodeship: Opole
- County: Opole
- Gmina: Prószków
- Time zone: UTC+1 (CET)
  - Summer (DST): UTC+2 (CEST)
- Vehicle registration: OPO

Nowa Kuźnia ([ˈnɔva ˈkuʑɲa], additional name in German: Neuhammer) is a village in the administrative district of Gmina Prószków, within Opole County, Opole Voivodeship, in south-western Poland.
