= Górki, Opole Voivodeship =

Górki Gorek
- Village
- Location within Poland
- Coordinates: 50°37′38″N 17°53′49″E
- Country: Poland
- Voivodeship: Opole
- County: Opole
- Gmina: Prószków

Population
  - Total: 680
- Time zone: UTC+1 (CET)
  - Summer (DST): UTC+2 (CEST)
- Vehicle registration: OPO

Górki ([ˈɡurki], additional name in German: Gorek) is a village in the administrative district of Gmina Prószków, within Opole County, Opole Voivodeship, in south-western Poland.

The name of the village is of Polish origin and comes from the word góra which means "hill".
