= Źlinice =

Źlinice Zlönitz
- Village
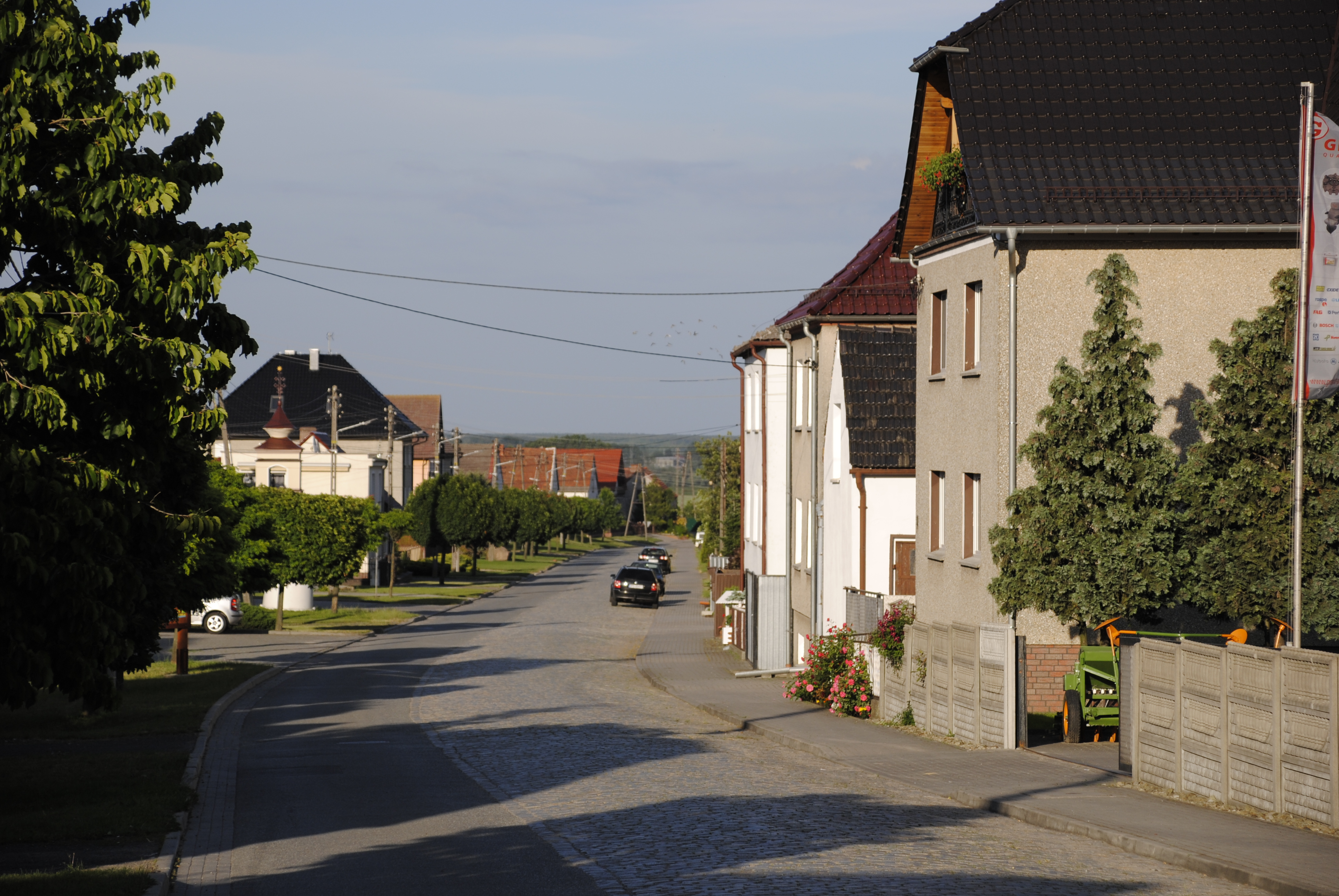

- Location within Poland
- Coordinates: 50°35′N 17°55′E
- Country: Poland
- Voivodeship: Opole
- County: Opole
- Gmina: Prószków
- Time zone: UTC+1 (CET)
  - Summer (DST): UTC+2 (CEST)
- Vehicle registration: OPO

Źlinice ([ʑliˈnit͡sɛ], additional name in German: Zlönitz) is a village in the administrative district of Gmina Prószków, within Opole County, Opole Voivodeship, in south-western Poland.
