= Ligota Prószkowska =

Ligota Prószkowska Ellguth Proskau
- Village
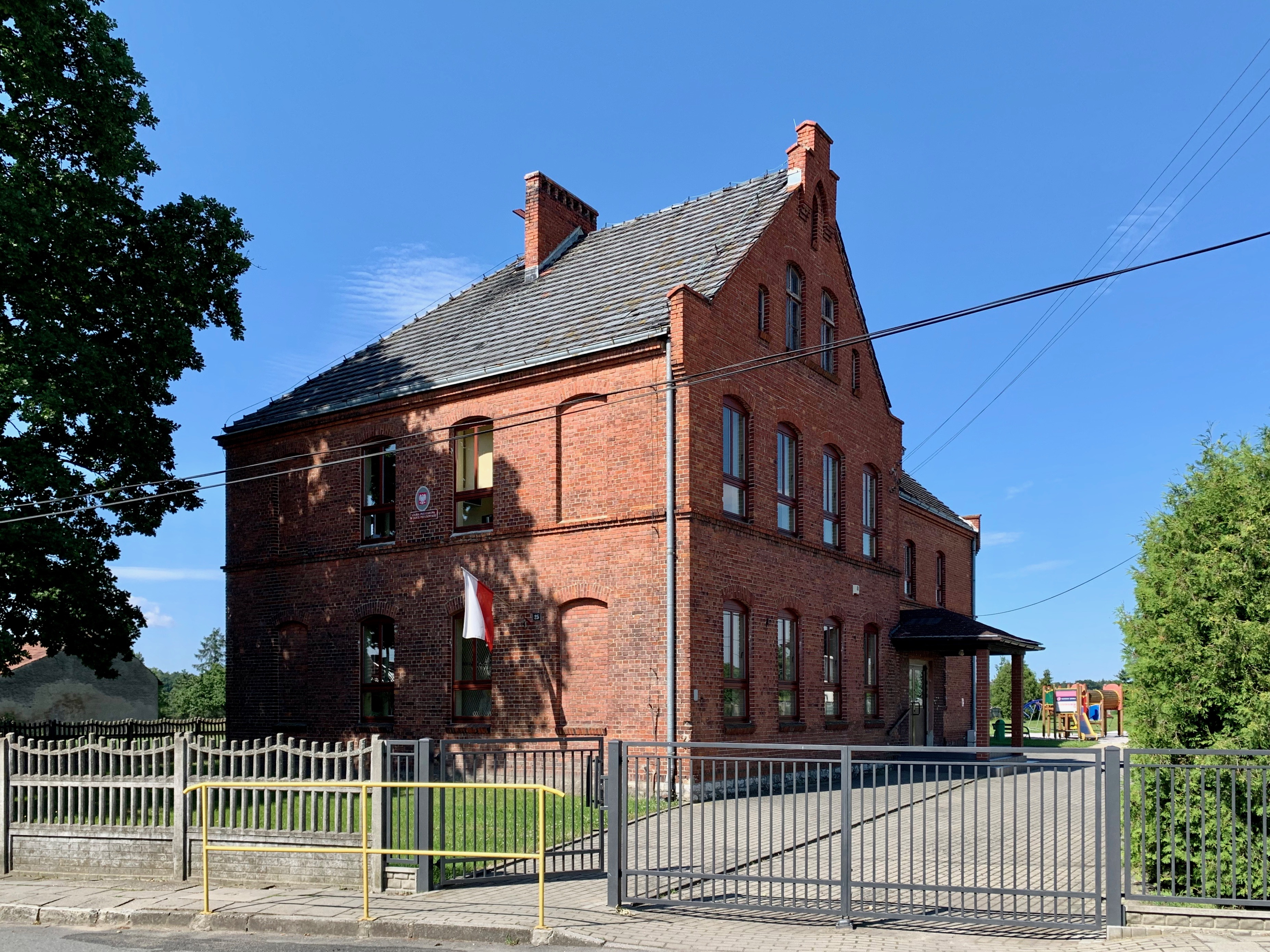
- School

- Location within Poland
- Coordinates: 50°34′N 17°50′E
- Country: Poland
- Voivodeship: Opole
- County: Opole
- Gmina: Prószków
- Population: 880
- Website: https://www.ligotaproszkowska.pl

Ligota Prószkowska [liˈɡɔta pruʂˈkɔfska], additional name in German: Ellguth Proskau, is a village in the administrative district of Gmina Prószków, within Opole County, Opole Voivodeship, in south-western Poland.
