= Folwark, Opole Voivodeship =

Folwark Follwark
- Village
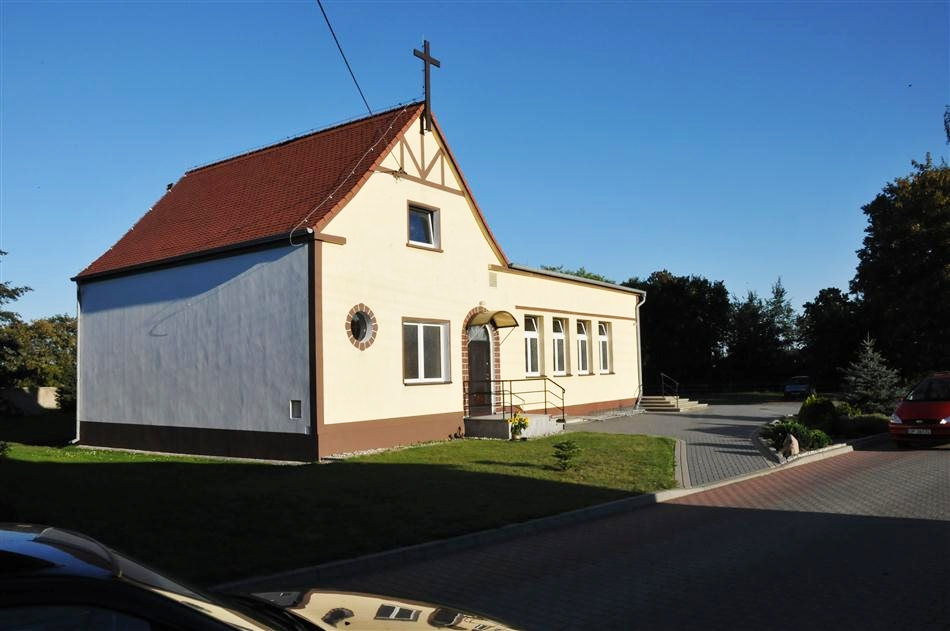
- Chapel

- Location within Poland
- Coordinates: 50°37′22″N 17°55′35″E
- Country: Poland
- Voivodeship: Opole
- County: Opole
- Gmina: Prószków
- Time zone: UTC+1 (CET)
  - Summer (DST): UTC+2 (CEST)
- Vehicle registration: OPO

Folwark ([ˈfɔlvark], additional name in German: Follwark) is a village in the administrative district of Gmina Prószków, within Opole County, Opole Voivodeship, in south-western Poland.
