= Jaśkowice, Gmina Prószków =

Jaśkowice Jaschkowitz
- Village
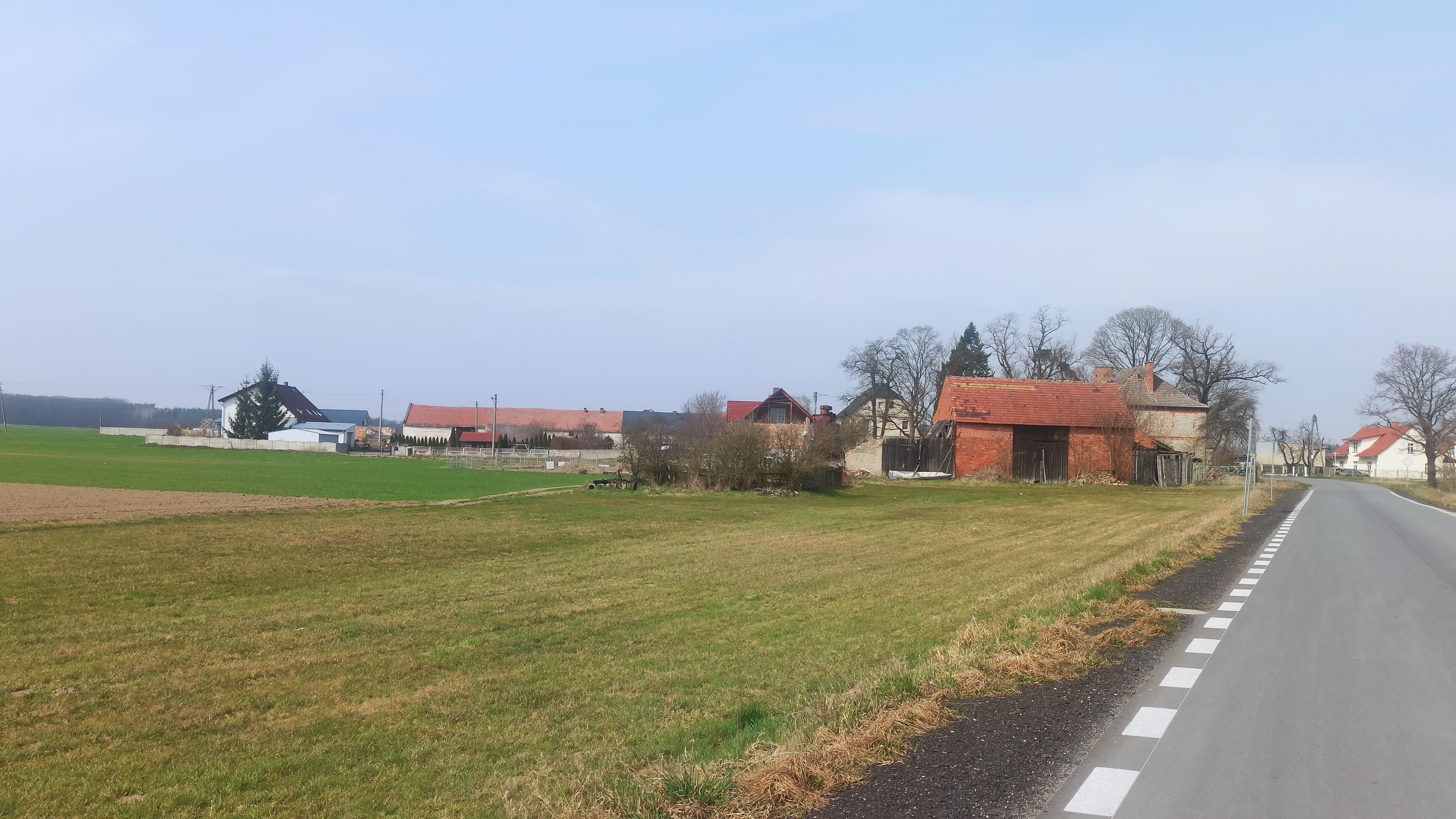

- Location within Poland
- Coordinates: 50°34′20″N 17°49′17″E
- Country: Poland
- Voivodeship: Opole
- County: Opole
- Gmina: Prószków

Population
  - Total: 260
- Time zone: UTC+1 (CET)
  - Summer (DST): UTC+2 (CEST)
- Vehicle registration: OPO

Jaśkowice ([jaɕkɔˈvit͡sɛ], additional name in German: Jaschkowitz) is a village in the administrative district of Gmina Prószków, within Opole County, Opole Voivodeship, in south-western Poland.
