= Złotniki, Opole Voivodeship =

Złotniki Zlattnik
- Village
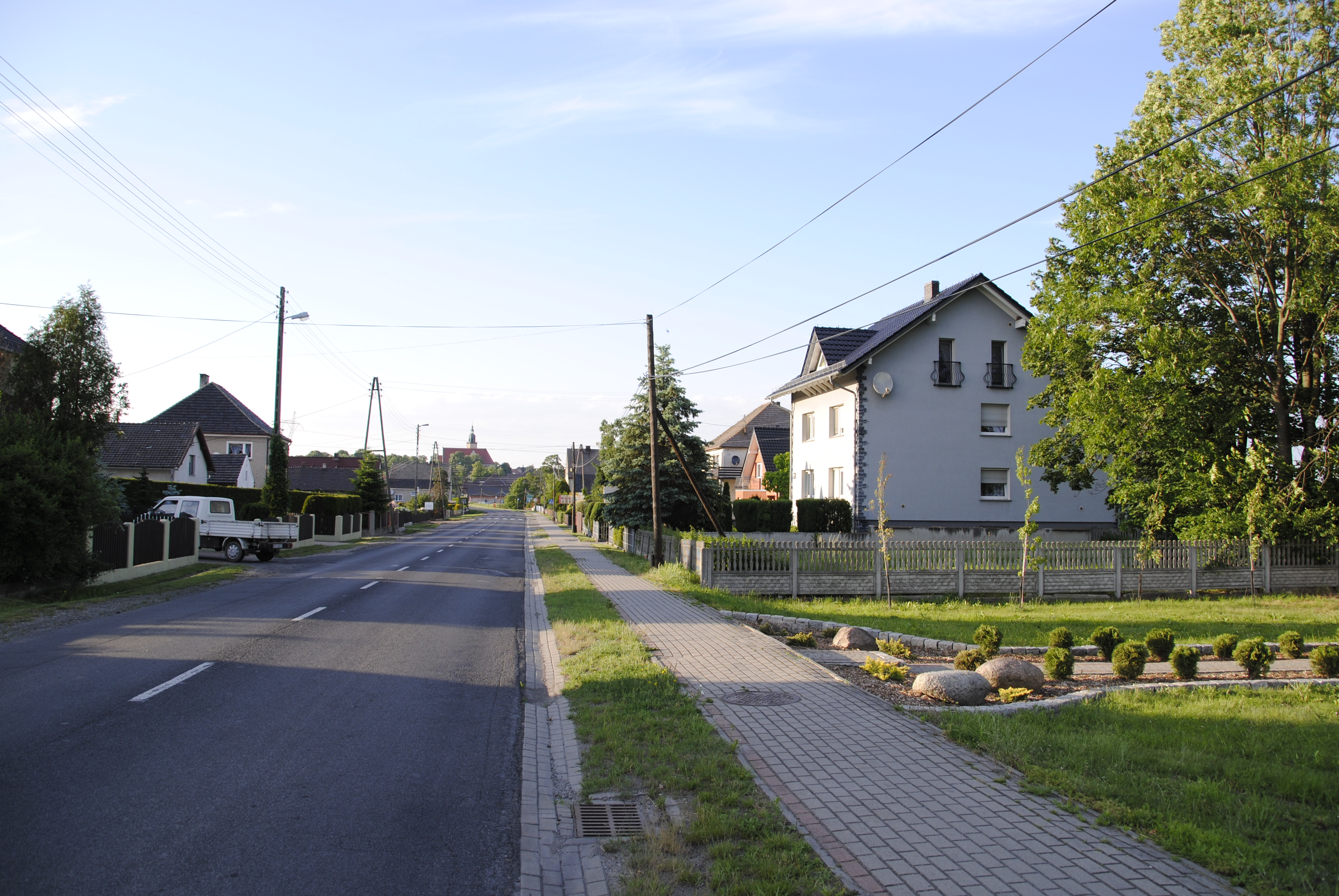

- Location within Poland
- Coordinates: 50°36′N 17°53′E
- Country: Poland
- Voivodeship: Opole
- County: Opole
- Gmina: Prószków
- Time zone: UTC+1 (CET)
  - Summer (DST): UTC+2 (CEST)
- Vehicle registration: OPO
- Website: https://www.zlotnikiopolskie.pl

Złotniki ([zwɔtˈniki], additional name in German: Zlattnik) is a village in the administrative district of Gmina Prószków, within Opole County, Opole Voivodeship, in south-western Poland.

== Notable people ==
- Alfred Zech, German child soldier in World War II
