= Frankenberger thesis =

Claim of Adolf Hitler's Jewish descent

The Frankenberger thesis, also Frankenreiter thesis, is a discredited thesis that claims Adolf Hitler's paternal grandfather was Jewish.

Referring to the parentage of Hitler's father Alois Hitler—who was born in 1837 as the illegitimate son of the housemaid Maria Anna Schicklgruber, which has not been clarified with absolute certainty—the Frankenberger thesis asserts that the unknown father of Hitler's father was a Jewish merchant from Graz named Leopold Frankenberger (or Frankenreiter) or his son and that Adolf Hitler was therefore a "quarter Jew" in the sense of the Nuremberg Race Laws later imposed by his own regime. Nazi politician Hans Frank brought the thesis into prominence through his 1946 memoir Im Angesicht des Galgens (In the Face of the Gallows), written while awaiting execution.

A 2025 DNA test on Hitler's blood upheld his established paternal ancestry, firmly refuting the Frankenberger thesis.

== Origin ==
Kershaw cites several stories circulating in the 1920s about Hitler's alleged Jewish ancestry, including one about a "Baron Rothschild" in Vienna in whose household Maria Schicklgruber had worked for some time as a servant.

The Frankenberger thesis in its final form goes back to Hans Frank's 1946 memoirs published under the title Im Angesicht des Galgens (In the Face of the Gallows), which he wrote while he was awaiting execution. Frank, who had acted as Hitler's lawyer in the late 1920s and early 1930s, states that he was commissioned by Hitler in 1930 to discreetly investigate the various rumors circulating in the press and public at the time alleging Hitler's Jewish descent.

According to Frank, during detailed research he was able to unearth some circumstantial evidence that made these rumors appear not entirely unreasonable: Hitler's grandmother Maria Anna Schicklgruber worked as a housemaid or cook in the house of a Jew from Graz named Frankenberger in the 1830s. In 1837, when she was very pregnant, she returned to her home village, where her son Alois was born. The column for the child's father was left blank in the baptismal register, but Maria Anna Schicklgruber received financial support from Frankenberger for the next 14 years.

It is disputed whether any Jews lived in Graz at the time of Alois Hitler's birth in 1837. The same is true for the similarly named Bohemian town Gratzen (now Nové Hrady, Czech Republic) which is closer to Schicklgruber's native region.

=== Frank's motivations ===
Some suggest that Frank (who turned against Nazism after 1945 but remained an antisemitic fanatic until his execution) made the claim that Hitler had Jewish ancestry as a way of proving that Hitler was really a "Jew" and not an "Aryan", and in this way "proved" that the Third Reich's crimes were the work of the "Jewish" Hitler. The full antisemitic implications of Frank's story were borne out in a letter entitled "Was Hitler a Jew?", written to the editor of a Saudi newspaper in 1982 by a German man living in Saudi Arabia. The writer accepted Frank's story as the truth, and added since Hitler was a Jew, "the Jews should pay Germans reparations for the War, because one of theirs caused the destruction of Germany".

But Jewish-American author Ron Rosenbaum suggested another reason for Frank's story:

On the other hand, a different version of Frank emerges in the brilliantly vicious, utterly unforgiving portrait of him by his son, Niklas Frank, who (in a memoir called In the Shadow of the Reich) depicts his father as a craven coward and weakling, but one not without a kind of animal cunning, an instinct for lying, insinuation, self-aggrandizement. For this Hans Frank, disgraced and facing death on the gallows for following Hitler, fabricating such a story might be a cunning way of ensuring his place in history as the one man who gave the world the hidden key to the mystery of Hitler's psyche. While at the same time, revenging himself on his former master for having led him to this end by foisting a sordid and humiliating explanation of Hitler on him for all posterity. In any case, it was one Frank knew the victors would find seductive.

== Historical evaluation ==
The validity of the Frankenberger thesis has been questioned in historical research since its inception. Consequently, it is rejected by most researchers. Both Frankenberger's paternity and his status as a Jew are questioned.

As early as 1956, Franz Jetzinger, author of Hitler’s Youth, pointed out that "the name Frankenberger [...] does not sound Jewish at all" and that it must therefore "first be proven" that Frankenberger—even if he was actually the father of Alois Hitler—actually was a Jew. Jetzinger also emphasized that "any evidence" was missing for alleged alimony payments. His conclusion is therefore: "Frank's report is at most sufficient to suspect Jewish descent, he does not guarantee a certainty."

In the 1960s, the archives of the city of Graz came to the conclusion that the alleged Frankenberger was probably identical to Leopold Frankenreiter: On the one hand, not a single Frankenberger could be found in the lists of residents of the city of Graz for the period in question and, on the other hand, this name corresponded to that name attributed by Hitler's nephew William Patrick Hitler to Hitler's grandmother's employer. However, Frankenreiter was not of Jewish descent, but had been baptized Catholic with his entire family. However, even after this correction, the name Frankenberger remained the one to be found much more frequently in the literature.

Joachim Fest judged that "the lack of verifiable evidence [...] makes the thesis appear extremely questionable". Although Frank had little reason to knowingly falsely ascribe Hitler Jewish ancestors, "the thesis can hardly stand up to serious discussion". The "actual meaning" of the thesis lies "less in its objective validity". "Far more decisive and psychologically significant" was "that Hitler had to see his origins cast into doubt by Frank's results. [...] Adolf Hitler did not know who his grandfather was." Brigitte Hamann, on the other hand, wrote that "here the angry antisemite Frank wanted to blame the hated Jews for an allegedly Jewish Hitler and unsettle them with rumours".

Maximilian I issued a decree in 1496 which expelled all Jews from Styria (including Graz), and they were not permitted to officially reside there again until the 1860s, decades after Alois had been born.

Notable historians who dismiss the thesis are Ian Kershaw, Robert Payne, Walter Görlitz, Anton Joachimsthaler, Christian Graf von Krockow, John Toland, Brigitte Hamann and Ernst Deuerlein.

The sensational claim of Hitler's Jewish descent has been taken up again and again by publications associated with conspiracy theories or sensationalist journalism. Such publications often present source material that has been known for decades as new knowledge and fail to mention the academic consensus rejecting this theory.

In May 2019, American psychologist Leonard Sax wrote an article titled "Aus den Gemeinden von Burgenland: Revisiting the question of Adolf Hitler's paternal grandfather" which attempts to provide evidence for the antisemitic conspiracy theory that Hitler had Jewish ancestry and that was the basis for his antisemitism. Sax points out that many Jews lived in places without official sanction and demonstrated the existence of a settled Jewish community in Graz before the law formally permitted their residence, saying that "Contemporary historians have largely dismissed Frank's claim, primarily on the grounds that there were purportedly no Jews living in Graz in 1836, when Hitler's father Alois Schicklgruber was conceived. This consensus can be traced to a single historian, Nikolaus von Preradovich," a Nazi sympathizer, "who claimed that 'not a single Jew' (kein einziger Jude) was living in Graz prior to 1856. No independent scholarship has confirmed Preradovich's conjecture. In this paper, evidence is presented that there was in fact 'a small, now settled community' (eine kleine, nun angesiedelte Gemeinde)—of Jews living in Graz before 1850." And that "The hypothesis that Hitler's paternal grandfather was Jewish, as claimed by Hans Frank, may fit the facts better than the alternative hypothesis that Hitler's paternal grandfather was Johann Georg Hiedler or Johann Nepomuk Hiedler."

However, historian Richard J. Evans has questioned Sax's findings. Evans wrote, "even if there were Jews living in Graz in the 1830s, at the time when Adolf Hitler's father Alois was born, this does not prove anything at all about the identity of Hitler's paternal grandfather." And, that, "There is no contemporary evidence that Hitler's mother was ever in Graz, or that there was a Jewish family called Frankenberger living there. There was a family in Graz called Frankenreiter but it was not Jewish. No correspondence between Hitler's father or paternal grandmother has ever been found. Nor is there any evidence for Frank's claim that Hitler's half-nephew knew about it and was blackmailing Hitler, as Frank claimed." Also, Evans noted that Sax is not a historian, but a psychiatrist, and that Sax seems to be motivated by attempting to prove Hitler had Jewish ancestry as a way to explain his antisemitism.

In 2025, blood from the sofa in Hitler's study was used by Turi King of the University of Bath for DNA analysis. The blood was confirmed to be Hitler's by comparing it to that of a relative with shared paternal ancestry, debunking the myth that an outsider to Hitler's known male line could have been his grandfather—conclusively refuting the Frankenberger thesis.

== See also ==
- Family of Adolf Hitler

== Sources ==
- Rosenbaum, Ron (1998). Explaining Hitler. New York: Random House. ISBN 9780679431510.
