= Family of Adolf Hitler =

Relatives and ancestors of Adolf Hitler

Hitler family
- Adolf Hitler visiting the grave of his parents Alois and Klara, 1938
- Earlier spellings: Hiedler, Hüttler
- Origin: Austria
- Members: Adolf Hitler; Alois Hitler; Klara Hitler; Paula Hitler; Angela Hitler; William Patrick Hitler; Heinz Hitler

The ancestors and relatives of Adolf Hitler have long been of interest to historians and genealogists because of the biological uncertainty of Hitler's paternal grandfather, as well as the family's inter-relationships and their psychological effect on Hitler during his childhood and later life.

Alois Schicklgruber (Adolf's father) changed his surname on 7 January 1877 to Hitler (derived from that of his deceased stepfather, Johann Georg Hiedler), which was the only form of the last name that his son Adolf used. (Note: Family trees can also be found in various Hitler biographies; e.g. Toland (1976), pp. 10–11; Kershaw (1999), p. 5.) Before Adolf Hitler's birth, his family used many variations of the family surname Hitler almost interchangeably. The common variants included Hiedler, Hüttler, Hytler, and Hittler.

Adolf Hitler's sister Paula, who died in 1960 and did not have children, was the last member of the family still bearing the Hitler surname on their tombstone. In 2025, it was reported that only five members of the Hitler family bloodline, all men who fathered no children, were still living. This figure does not include Hitler's maternal cousins, the Koppensteiners. Three of these descendants are sons of Adolf Hitler's nephew, William. William Hitler was not on good terms with Adolf Hitler, who referred to William as his "loathsome nephew". William was publicly critical of his uncle, fought with the United States Navy during World War II, and after WWII ended, changed his last name from Hitler to Stuart-Houston. None of William's sons, who all bear the last name Stuart-Houston, have had children of their own.

== Etymology ==
There are several different theories for the surname's origin and meaning.

The Austrian historian and social democratic politician Franz Jetzinger noted in his 1976 biography of Adolf Hitler that many Nazis asserted that the name Hitler derived from Hirt (meaning a herdsman) or Hüter (a guardian or protector), framing their Führer as the divinely-ordained "shepherd of all Germans." Jetzinger dismissed this explanation outright as "nonsense," acknowledging that Hirt could change into Hiater or Hieter but claiming that it simply never could evolve into Hitler. He likewise rejected the idea that Hütte (meaning hut) could have become Hüttler (in English, 'hutter') and thence Hitler as "clearly wrong," asserting that it could instead only evolve into Hüttner even though both derivations are attested.

According to Jetzinger, "no amount of ingenuity can provide the name, Hitler, with a plausible German derivation." Instead, he argued, the name is likely a Germanized corruption of the Czech Hidlar or Hidlarček (of which he does not give the etymology), pointing to a supposed 15th-century influx of Czech settlers in the Waldviertel region along with the historic influence of the Bohemian branch of the Knights Hospitaller over Spital near Weitra where Adolf Hitler's own family lived for generations.

Jetzinger's hypothesis was accepted by German historian Joachim Fest, who stated in his own biography of Hitler that "The name Hitler, Hiedler, or Hüttler is probably of Czech origin." Brigitte Hamann expressed that "that the name Hitler [...] may come from the Czech[s], is certainly possible" but "The most plausible interpretation is that the name comes from 'Hütte' (cottage), in other words, that it means 'Häusler," which is both an old term for [a] miner and denotes someone who lives in a small house. Thus among Hitler's known ancestors there is no one whose name indicates Czech origin." Ian Kershaw rejected the theory, stating "Jetzinger's claim that the name 'Hitler' was of Czech origin has been shown to rest on flimsy grounds. 'Hüttler', meaning cottager or smallholder, was not an uncommon name in Austria."

In a similar strain of thought to Jetzinger, the journalist and historian Konrad Heiden speculated about the surname possibly being Jewish in origin, writing in 1936: "The unusual and rather curious name of Hitler occurs more frequently among Eastern Jews than among Germans, and particularly in Galicia, Bukovina, Roumania and Poland." One such example is Semyon Hitler, a decorated Jewish Ukrainian Red Army soldier who fought in the Battles of Odessa and Sevastopol. "We are not justified, however," Heiden wrote, "in taking this as proof of a 'Jewish grandmother' of Adolf Hitler, no matter how many Abraham Hitlers, Herz Hitlers, or Esther Hitlers lived in Polna in Moravia and migrated thence to Vienna. No credible connection has so far been proved."

Such rumors of "subversive" Jewish origin, if true, would have been politically inconvenient for Adolf Hitler and the Nazi Party which preached Aryan racial supremacy. Thus, they proliferated in the anti-Nazi and sensationalist foreign press. Interest in Hitler's alleged Jewish and non-German ancestry was revived after World War II by the Frankenberger thesis, but has since been firmly discredited by historians, genealogists, and more recently geneticists.

According to German onomast Jürgen Udolph, the surname might mean one who resides by a Hiedl, a term for a subterranean river or fountain in Austro-Bavarian dialects. Max Gottschald corroborates the term Hied(e)l in his book Deutsche Namenkunde, describing it as an "occasionally drying spring," but proposes two separate origins and meanings of the Hitler surname: a 14th-century variation of Hüttler, meaning an overseer of the salt deposits of the River Salzach; and an 18th-century variation of Hiedler, meaning one who guards, descending from the Middle High German huot(e).

== Family history ==
The family is of Austrian German ethnicity.

=== Earliest family members ===
The first known beginning of the Hitler family is with Stefan Hiedler (born 1672) and Agnes Capeller, whose grandson Martin Hiedler (17 November 1762 – 10 January 1829) married Anna Maria Göschl (23 August 1760 – 7 December 1854). This couple had at least three children: Lorenz (1800–1861), Johann Georg (baptised 28 February 1792 – 9 February 1857), and Johann Nepomuk (19 March 1807 – 17 September 1888). Johann Georg was the stepfather of Alois Schicklgruber (later Hitler), who was Adolf Hitler's father, and Johann Nepomuk was the future Führer's maternal great-grandfather. There is no additional information about Lorenz Hiedler. The Hiedlers were from Spital, a part of Weitra in Austria.

=== Johann Georg and Johann Nepomuk ===
Brothers Johann Georg and Johann Nepomuk Hiedler are associated with Adolf Hitler in several ways, although the biological relationship is disputed.

Johann Georg was considered the officially accepted paternal grandfather of Hitler. Whether he was actually Hitler's biological paternal grandfather remains unknown. He married his first wife in 1824, but she died in childbirth five months later. In 1842, he married Maria Anna Schicklgruber (15 April 1795 – 7 January 1847) and became the legal stepfather to her illegitimate five-year-old son, Alois.

Around age 10, near the time of his mother's death, Alois went to live with Johann Nepomuk Hiedler (also known as Johann Nepomuk Hüttler) on his farm. Johann Nepomuk Hiedler became a relatively prosperous farmer and was married to Eva Maria Decker (1792–1873), who was fifteen years his senior. Johann Nepomuk Hiedler was named after Johann Nepomuk, a Bohemian saint for Bohemians of both German and Czech ethnicity. The Nazis issued a pamphlet during the 1932 second elections campaign titled "Facts and Lies about Hitler" which refuted the rumour spread by the Social Democrats and Centre Party that Hitler had Czech ancestors. There is no evidence that any of Hitler's ancestors were of Czech origin.

=== Father of Alois Hitler ===
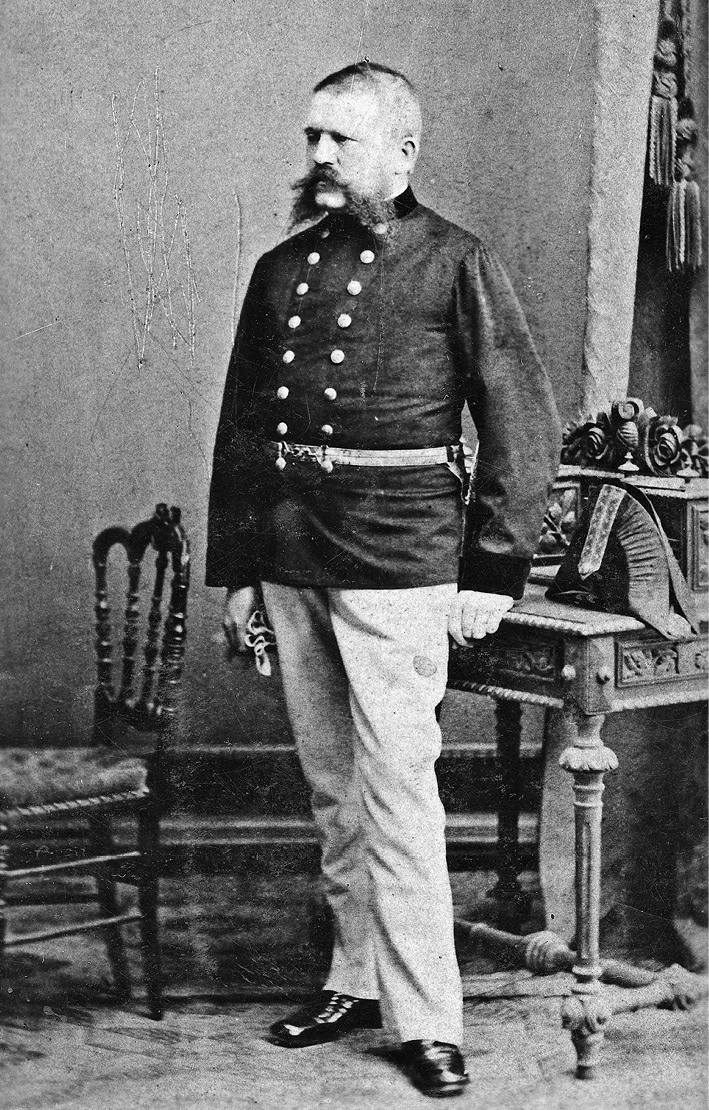
Alois Hitler, Adolf's father

The identity of the biological father of Alois is disputed. Legally, Johann Georg Hiedler, an itinerant miller, was the step-father of Alois Schicklgruber (later Alois Hitler), and Johann Georg's brother Johann Nepomuk Hiedler was therefore the step-uncle of Alois. Johann Nepomuk adopted Alois informally during Alois's childhood and raised him. It is possible that he was, in fact, the natural father of Alois but could not acknowledge this publicly due to his marriage. A perhaps simpler explanation is that he pitied the ten-year-old Alois after the death of the boy's mother Maria, as it could hardly have been a suitable life for a ten-year-old child to be raised by an itinerant miller. Johann Nepomuk died on 17 September 1888 and willed Alois a considerable portion of his life savings.

It was later claimed that Johann Georg had fathered Alois prior to his marriage to Maria. The claim that Johann Georg was the true father of Alois was not made during the lifetime of either Johann Georg or Maria. In 1877, 20 years after the death of Johann Georg and almost 30 years after the death of Maria, Alois was legally declared to have been Johann Georg's son. Johann Nepomuk arranged to change the surname of Alois to "Hitler" and to have Johann Georg declared the biological father of Alois in 1876. Johann Nepomuk collected three witnesses (his son-in-law and two others) who testified before a notary in Weitra that Johann Georg had several times stated in their presence that he was the actual father of Alois and wanted to make Alois his legitimate son and heir. The parish priest in Döllersheim, where the original birth certificate of Alois was kept, added Johann Georg's name to the birth register. Alois was 39 years old at the time and was well-known in the community as Alois Schicklgruber.

Accordingly, Johann Georg Hiedler is often cited as having possibly been the biological grandfather of Adolf Hitler. Although Alois was legitimized and Johann Georg Hiedler was considered the officially accepted paternal grandfather of Hitler by the Third Reich, whether he was Hitler's biological grandfather remains unknown, which has caused speculation. However, his case is considered the most plausible and widely accepted. Other speculations include Johann Nepomuk, and a Graz Jew by the name of Leopold Frankenberger, as rumored by the head of the General Government in Nazi-occupied Poland, Hans Frank, during the Nuremberg Trials. Historians have concluded that Frank's speculation has no factual support. Frank said that Maria came from "Leonding near Linz", when in fact she came from the hamlet of Strone's, near the village of Döllersheim. No evidence has been found that a "Frankenberger" lived in the area; the Jews were expelled from Styria (which includes Graz) during the 15th century and were not permitted to return until the 1860s, several decades after the birth of Alois. (Note: Toland (1976)'s conclusion is based on the research of Nikolaus Preradovic, University of Graz, who examined the books of the Jewish congregation at Graz and concluded that prior to 1856 there had not been "one single Jew" in Graz since the 15th century. Kershaw (1999) concludes that, whoever the actual father of Alois may have been, he was not a Jew from Graz.)

=== Pölzl family ===
Johanna Hiedler, the daughter of Johann Nepomuk and Eva Hiedler (née Decker) was born on 19 January 1830 in Spital (part of Weitra) in the Waldviertel of Lower Austria. She lived her entire life there and was married to Johann Baptist Pölzl (1825–1901), a farmer and son of Johann Pölzl and Juliana (Walli) Pölzl. Johanna and Johann had five sons and six daughters, of whom two sons and three daughters survived into adulthood, the daughters being Klara, Johanna, and Theresia. Klara's brothers' identities are unknown.

=== 1870s ===
At the age of 36, Alois Hitler was married for the first time, to Anna Glasl-Hörer (née Glasl), the 50-year-old adopted daughter of a wealthy customs official. She had an illegitimate son named Josef Glasl-Hörer, born on 16 October 1851 in Radstadt. Anna was sick when Alois married her and was either an invalid or became one soon afterwards. Not long after the wedding, Alois Hitler began an affair with 19-year-old Franziska "Fanni" Matzelsberger, one of the young female servants employed at the Pommer Inn, house no. 219, in the town of Braunau am Inn, where he was renting the top floor as a lodging. Bradley Smith states that Alois had numerous affairs during the 1870s, resulting in his wife initiating legal action. On 7 November 1880, Alois and Anna separated by mutual agreement. Franziska Matzelsberger became the 43-year-old Hitler's girlfriend, but the two could not marry since by Roman Catholic canon law, divorce is not permitted.

=== 1880s ===
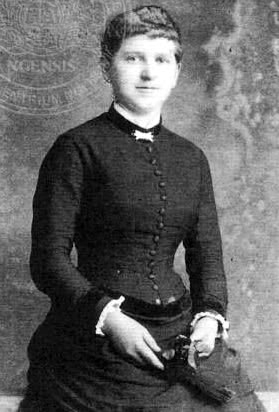
Klara Pölzl Hitler, third wife of Alois and mother of Adolf

On 13 January 1882, Franziska Matzelsberger gave birth to Alois Hitler's illegitimate son, also named Alois. As his parents were not married, the boy was named Alois Matzelsberger. Alois Hitler remained with Franziska while his wife, Anna, grew sicker and died on 6 April 1883. The next month, on 22 May, in a ceremony in Braunau with fellow customs officials as witnesses, Alois Hitler, 45, married Franziska Matzelsberger, 21. Alois then legitimized his son with Franziska, renaming him Alois Hitler Jr., who later became a Berlin restaurateur. Matzelsberger went to Vienna to give birth to Angela Hitler. When Franziska was only 23 years old, she acquired a lung disorder and became too ill to function. She was relocated to Ranshofen, a small village near Braunau.

In 1876, three years after Alois' marriage to Anna Glasl-Hörer, he had hired Klara Pölzl as a household servant. Klara was the 16-year-old granddaughter of Alois' step-uncle (and possible biological uncle or father), Johann Nepomuk Hiedler. After Franziska demanded that the "servant girl" find another job, Alois sent Klara away. However, Klara returned to Alois and Franziska's home during the last months of Franziska's life, to care for her and her two children, as she was an invalid. Franziska Matzelsberger died in Ranshofen on 10 August 1884 at the age of 23. After Franziska's death, Klara Pölzl stayed on as housekeeper.

Klara Pölzl soon became pregnant. Her family relationship with Alois was ambiguous. If Johann Georg Hiedler were Alois Hitler's biological father, Klara would be Alois' first cousin once removed; if Johann Nepomuk were Alois Hitler's biological father, Klara would be Alois' half-niece. Bradley Smith writes that if he had been free to do as he wished, Alois would have married Klara immediately, but because of the affidavit regarding his paternity, Alois was now legally Klara's first cousin once removed, and so too close to marry. Alois submitted an appeal to the church for a humanitarian waiver. (Note: Alois petitioned the church for an episcopal dispensation citing "bilateral affinity in the third degree touching the second" to describe his rather complicated family relationship to Klara. The local bishop apparently believed this relationship was too close to approve on his own authority, so he forwarded the petition to Rome on behalf of Alois, seeking instead a papal dispensation, which was approved before the birth of the couple's first child.) Permission was granted, and on 7 January 1885 the wedding took place in Hitler's rented rooms on the top floor of the Pommer Inn. A meal was served to the few guests and witnesses. Alois then went to work for the rest of the day. Even Klara found the wedding to be a brief ceremony. Throughout the marriage, she continued to call him uncle.

On 17 May 1885, five months after the wedding, the new Frau Klara Hitler gave birth to Gustav, her first child with Alois Hitler. One year later, on 25 September 1886, she gave birth to a daughter, Ida. The third child, Otto, was born not long after Ida, in 1887, (Note: In 2016, a local newspaper claimed that Otto Hitler was born on 17 June 1892 – after Adolf Hitler's birth, making Adolf the third rather than fourth of six siblings – and then died six days later from hydrocephalus (a swelling of the brain).) but died days later. In the winter of 1887/88, both Gustav and Ida died of diphtheria, 8 December and 2 January, respectively. By then, Klara and Alois had been married for three years, and all their children were dead, but his children with Franziska Matzelsberger – Alois Jr. and Angela – survived. On 20 April 1889, Klara gave birth to Adolf Hitler.

=== 1890s ===
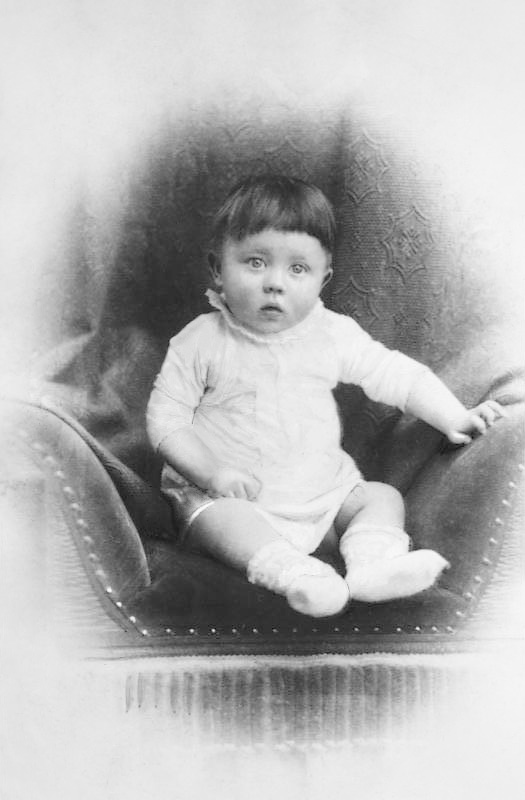
Infant Adolf, son of Alois and Klara

Adolf was a sickly child, and his mother fretted over him. Alois, who was 51 years old when Adolf was born, had little interest in child rearing and left it to his wife. When not at work he was typically either in a tavern or busy with his hobby, beekeeping.

In 1892, Alois was transferred from Braunau to Passau. He was 55, Klara 32, Alois Jr. 10, Angela 9, and Adolf 3 years old. In 1894, Alois Hitler was reassigned to Linz. Klara gave birth to their fifth child, Edmund, on 24 March 1894, and it was decided that she and the children would stay in Passau for the time being.

In February 1895, Alois Hitler purchased a house on a 3.6-hectare (8.9-acre) plot in Hafeld near Lambach, approximately 50 kilometres (30 mi) southwest of Linz. The farm was called the Rauscher Gut. He relocated his family to the farm and retired on 25 June 1895 at the age of 58 after 40 years in the customs service. He found farming difficult; he lost money, and the value of the property decreased. On 21 January 1896, his daughter Paula was born. Alois was often home with his family. He had five children ranging in age from infancy to 14; Bradley Smith suggests he yelled at the children frequently and made long visits to the local tavern. Robert G. L. Waite noted, "Even one of his closest friends admitted that Alois was 'awfully rough' with his wife Klara and hardly ever spoke a word to her at home."

After Alois and Alois Jr. had a violent argument, Alois Jr. left home at 14, and the elder Alois swore he would never give the boy any inheritance more than what the law required. Apparently Alois Jr.'s relations with his stepmother Klara were also difficult. After working as an apprentice waiter in the Shelbourne Hotel in Dublin, Ireland, Alois Jr. was arrested for theft and served a five-month sentence in 1900, followed by a nine-month sentence in 1902.

=== 1900s ===
Edmund, the youngest Hitler boy, died of measles on 2 February 1900. Alois wanted his son Adolf to seek a career with the civil service. According to various interpretations, Adolf disliked the thought of a career spent enforcing petty rules, and was perhaps so alienated from his father that he was repulsed by whatever Alois wanted. Alois tried to intimidate his son into obedience, but Adolf refused.

Alois Hitler died in 1903, leaving Klara a government pension. She sold the house in Leonding and relocated with young Adolf and Paula to an apartment in Linz, where they lived frugally. By 1907, Klara had become very ill due to breast cancer. Despite continued medical treatment by her doctor, Eduard Bloch, Klara's condition did not improve, and in October Bloch told Adolf her condition was hopeless. Adolf wept when told that his mother "had little chance of surviving". Klara died at home in Linz on 21 December 1907. Adolf and Paula were left with some financial assistance from their mother's pension and her modest estate of about 2,000 Kronen, after the medical and funeral costs were paid. Klara was buried in Leonding. Hitler had a good relationship with his mother during her lifetime. He was distraught by her death and possibly grieved for the rest of his life. Speaking of Hitler, Bloch later recalled that after Klara's death he had never seen "anyone so prostrate with grief". Hitler wrote years later that his mother's death was a "dreadful blow".

On 14 September 1903 Angela Hitler, Adolf's half-sister, married Leo Raubal (11 June 1879 – 10 August 1910), a junior tax inspector, and on 12 October 1906 she gave birth to a son, Leo. On 4 June 1908 Angela gave birth to a daughter Geli and in 1910 to a second daughter, Elfriede (Elfriede Maria Hochegger, 10 January 1910 – 24 September 1993).

=== 1910s ===
In 1909, Alois Hitler Jr. met an Irish woman by the name of Bridget Dowling at the Dublin Horse Show. They eloped to London and married on 3 June 1910. William Dowling, Bridget's father, threatened to have Alois arrested for kidnapping, but Bridget dissuaded him. The couple settled in Liverpool, where their son William Patrick Hitler was born in 1911. The family lived in a flat at 102 Upper Stanhope Street. The house was destroyed in the last German air-raid on Liverpool on 10 January 1942. Nothing remains of the house or those that surrounded it, and the area was eventually cleared and grassed over. In her memoirs, Bridget Dowling claims that Adolf Hitler lived with them in Liverpool from 1912 to 1913 while he was on the run to avoid being conscripted in his native Austria-Hungary, but historians dismiss this story as a fiction invented to make the book more appealing to publishers. Alois attempted to make money by managing a small restaurant in Dale Street, a boarding house on Parliament Street and a hotel on Mount Pleasant, all of which failed. Alois Jr. left his family in May 1914 and he returned alone to the German Empire to establish himself in the restaurant business.

Paula had relocated to Vienna, where she worked as a secretary. She did not communicate with Adolf Hitler during the period comprising his difficult years as a painter in Vienna and later Munich, military service during the First World War and early political activities back in Munich. She was delighted to meet him again in Vienna during the early 1920s, though she later claimed to have been privately distraught at his subsequent increasing fame.

==== First World War ====
When the First World War began, Alois Jr. was in Germany and it was impossible for his wife and son to join him. He married another woman, Hedwig Heidemann, in 1916. After the war, a third party mistakenly informed Bridget that he was dead.

At the beginning of the First World War, Adolf Hitler was a resident of Munich and volunteered to serve in the Bavarian Army as an Austrian citizen. He was posted to the Bavarian Reserve Infantry Regiment 16 (1st Company of the List Regiment). Hitler's case was not exceptional as he was not the only Austrian soldier in the List Regiment. Hitler may have been accepted into the Bavarian army because nobody had asked him whether he was a German citizen when he volunteered, or because the recruiting authorities were happy to accept any volunteer and did not care what Hitler's nationality was, or because he might have told the Bavarian authorities that he intended to become a German citizen.

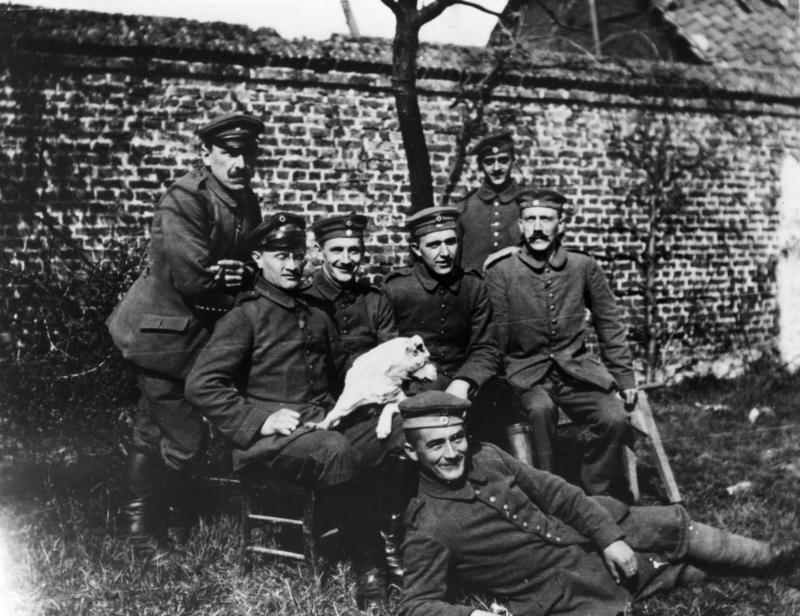
Hitler (sitting far right) with his army comrades of the Bavarian Reserve Infantry Regiment 16 (c. 1914–1918)

He served as a dispatch runner on the Western Front in France and Belgium, spending nearly half his time well behind the front lines. He was present at the First Battle of Ypres, the Battle of the Somme, the Battle of Arras and the Battle of Passchendaele, and was wounded at the Somme.

He was decorated for bravery, receiving the Iron Cross, Second Class, in 1914. Recommended by Hugo Gutmann, he received the Iron Cross, First Class, on 4 August 1918, a decoration rarely awarded to one of Hitler's low rank (Gefreiter, equivalent to corporal). Hitler's post at regimental headquarters, providing frequent interactions with senior officers, may have helped him receive this decoration. Though his rewarded actions may have been courageous, they were probably not very exceptional. He also received the Black Wound Badge on 18 May 1918.

During his service at headquarters Hitler pursued his artwork, drawing cartoons, and instructions for an army newspaper. During the Battle of the Somme in October 1916, he was wounded either in the groin area or the left thigh by a shell that had exploded in the dispatch runners' dugout.

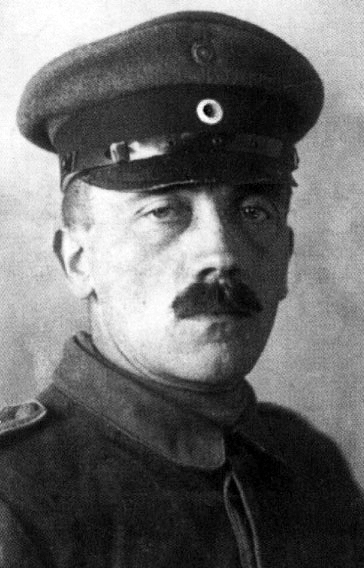
Adolf Hitler in 1921

Hitler spent almost two months in the Red Cross hospital at Beelitz, returning to his regiment on 5 March 1917. On 15 October 1918, he was temporarily blinded by a mustard gas attack and was hospitalised in Pasewalk. While there, Hitler learnt of Germany's defeat, and – by his own account – on receiving this news, he suffered a second bout of blindness.

Hitler became embittered about Germany's defeat, and his ideological development began. He described the war as "the greatest of all experiences", and was praised by his commanding officers for his bravery. The experience reinforced his German nationalist beliefs and he was shocked by Germany's capitulation in November 1918. Like other German nationalists, he believed in the Dolchstoßlegende ('stab-in-the-back legend'), according to which the German army, "undefeated in the field", had been "stabbed in the back" on the home front by civilian politicians and Marxists, later dubbed the "November criminals".

The Treaty of Versailles stipulated that Germany was to relinquish several of its territories and demilitarise the Rhineland. The treaty imposed economic sanctions and levied large reparations on the country. Many Germans perceived the treaty – especially Article 231, which declared Germany responsible for the war – as a humiliation. The Versailles Treaty and the conditions in Germany after the war were later exploited by Hitler for political gains.

As a result of Alois Jr.'s decision to desert his first wife, Bridget Dowling, Dowling would raise their son alone in North London, England, while being supported by her family in Ireland.

=== 1920s ===
On 14 March 1920, Heinrich "Heinz" Hitler was born to Alois Jr. and his second wife, Hedwig Heidemann. In 1924, Alois Jr. was prosecuted for bigamy, but acquitted due to Bridget's intervention on his behalf. His older son, William Patrick, stayed with Alois and his new family during his early trips to Weimar Republic Germany in the late 1920s and early 1930s.

When Adolf was confined in Landsberg, Angela travelled from Vienna to visit him. Angela's daughters, Geli and Elfriede, accompanied their mother when she became Hitler's housekeeper in 1925; Geli Raubal was 17 at the time and would spend the next six years in close contact with her half-uncle. Her mother was given a job as housekeeper at the Berghof villa near Berchtesgaden in 1928. Geli relocated into Hitler's Munich apartment in 1929 when she enrolled in the LMU Munich to study medicine. She did not complete her medical studies.

Hitler behaved in a domineering and possessive manner with Geli. When he discovered she was having a relationship with his chauffeur, Emil Maurice, he forced an end to the affair and dismissed Maurice from his personal service. After that he did not allow her to associate freely with friends, and attempted to have himself or someone he trusted near her at all times, accompanying her while she shopped or attended movies or opera.

In 1926, Alois Jr. joined the National Socialist German Workers' Party (NSDAP), under the leadership of his half-brother; however, he left it the following year. After being arrested in Britain in the summer of 1945 after traveling with forged documents, Alois Jr. was revealed to have opted to distance himself from politics during Adolf Hitler's rule over Nazi Germany and had never been a member of the Nazi Party during this time.

Adolf met Eva Braun, 23 years his junior, at Heinrich Hoffmann's photography studio in Munich in October 1929. He occasionally dated other women as well, including Hoffmann's daughter, Henrietta, and Maria Reiter.

=== 1930s ===
Hitler's half-niece Geli Raubal committed suicide in 1931. Rumours immediately began in the media about a possible sexual relationship, and murder. Historian Ian Kershaw contends that stories which circulated at the time alleging "sexual deviant practices ought to be viewed as anti-Hitler propaganda".

After having little communication with her brother Adolf, Paula was delighted to meet him again in Vienna during the early 1930s.

When the NSDAP won 107 seats in the Reich parliament in 1930, the Times Union in Albany, New York, published a statement of Alois, Jr.

=== Second World War ===
As Hitler prepared for war, he became distant from his family. Angela and Adolf became estranged after she disapproved of Adolf's relationship with Eva Braun, but eventually re-established communication during the war. Angela was his intermediary to the rest of the family, because Adolf did not want communication with them. In 1941, she sold her memoirs of her years with Hitler to the Eher Verlag, which brought her 20,000 ℛ︁ℳ︁, equivalent to €85,900 in 2021. Meanwhile, Alois Jr. continued to manage his restaurant throughout the duration of the war. He was arrested later by the British, but released when it became evident he had no role in his brother's regime.

Hitler's second cousin, once removed, Aloisa Veit (named as Alois V), was gassed as part of the Nazi programme Aktion T4 which was a campaign to kill people who were deemed to be mentally ill. It is not known if Hitler knew of her fate.

A couple of Adolf's relatives served in Nazi Germany during the war. Adolf's half-nephew Heinz was a member of the Nazi Party. He attended an elite military academy, the National Political Institutes of Education (Napola) in Ballenstedt, Anhalt.^{[1]} Aspiring to be an officer, Heinz joined the army as a signals NCO with the 23rd Potsdamer Artillery Regiment in 1941, and he participated with the invasion of the Soviet Union, Operation Barbarossa. On 10 January 1942, he was captured by Soviet forces and sent to the Moscow military prison Butyrka, where he died, aged 21, after interrogation and torture. He never married nor had children.

Adolf's other half-nephew, Leo Rudolf Raubal, was conscripted into the Luftwaffe. He was wounded in January 1943 during the Battle of Stalingrad, and Friedrich Paulus asked Hitler for an airplane to evacuate Raubal to Germany. Hitler refused and Raubal was captured by the Soviets on 31 January 1943. Hitler gave orders to check the possibility of a prisoner exchange with the Soviets for Stalin's son Yakov Dzhugashvili, who was in German captivity since 16 July 1941. Stalin refused to exchange him either for Raubal or for Friedrich Paulus, and said "war is war".

During the spring of 1945, after the destruction of Dresden in the massive bomb attack of 13/14 February, Adolf relocated Angela to Berchtesgaden to avoid her being captured by the Soviets. Also, he let her and his younger sister Paula have more than 100,000 ℛ︁ℳ︁, equivalent to €394,700 in 2021. Paula barely saw her brother during the war. There is some evidence Paula shared her brother's strong German nationalist beliefs, but she was not politically active and never joined the Nazi Party. Towards the end of the war, at the age of 49, she was driven to Berchtesgaden, Germany, apparently on the orders of Martin Bormann.

After midnight on the night of 28–29 April 1945, Adolf and Eva Braun were married in a small civil ceremony in the Führerbunker in Berlin. At the same location, on the following day of 30 April, the couple committed suicide.

=== Post-Second World War ===
In Hitler's last will and testament, he guaranteed Angela a pension of 1,000 ℛ︁ℳ︁ monthly, equivalent to €3,900 in 2021. It is uncertain if she ever received any of this amount. Nevertheless, she spoke very well of him even after the war, and claimed that neither her brother nor she herself had known anything about the Holocaust. She declared that if Hitler had known what was going on in the concentration camps, he would have stopped them.

Adolf's sister Paula was arrested by US intelligence officers in May 1945 and debriefed later that year. A transcript shows one of the agents remarking she bore a physical resemblance to her sibling. She told them the Soviets had confiscated her house in Austria, the Americans had expropriated her Vienna apartment and that she was taking English lessons. She characterized her childhood relationship with her brother as one of both frequent bickering and strong affection. Paula said she could not believe her brother had been responsible for the Holocaust. She also told them she had met Eva Braun only once. Paula was released from American custody and returned to Vienna, where she lived on her savings for a time, then worked in an arts and crafts shop.

Other relatives of Hitler were appropriated by the Soviets. In May 1945, five of Hitler's relatives were arrested, his first cousins, Maria, Johann and Eduard Schmidt, along with Maria's husband Ignaz Koppensteiner, their son Adolf, and Johann Schmidt Jr., son of Maria and Eduard's deceased brother Johann. Koppensteiner was arrested by the Soviets on the basis that he "approved of [Hitler's] criminal plans against the USSR". He died in a Moscow prison in 1949. Both Eduard and Maria died in Soviet custody in 1951 and 1953, respectively. Johann Jr. was released in 1955. These relatives were pardoned posthumously by Russia in 1997.

In 1952, Paula Hitler relocated to Berchtesgaden, reportedly living "in seclusion" in a two-room flat as Paula Wolff. ("Wolf" was Adolf Hitler's self-adopted nickname.) During this time, she was cared for by former members of the SS and survivors of her brother's inner circle. In February 1959, she agreed to be interviewed by Peter Morley, a documentary producer for British television station Associated-Rediffusion. The resulting conversation was the only filmed interview she ever gave and was broadcast as part of a programme named Tyranny: The Years of Adolf Hitler. She talked mostly about Hitler's childhood.

Angela died of a stroke on 30 October 1949. Her brother, Alois Jr., died on 20 May 1956 in Hamburg. At that time, his name was Alois Hiller. Paula, Adolf's last surviving sibling, died on 1 June 1960, at the age of 64.

=== Descendants of relatives ===
Angela married Leo Raubal Sr. (1879–1910). They had three children: Leo Rudolf Raubal Jr had one son, Peter Raubal, in 1931; Geli Raubal committed suicide without ever having a child in 1931; and Elfriede Raubal married Ernst Hochegger in 1937 and had a son, Heiner Hochegger, in 1945 and a daughter.

Heinz Hitler, who was the son of Alois from his second marriage, died in a Soviet military prison in 1942 without children.

William Patrick Hitler, the son of Alois from his first marriage, married Phyllis Jean-Jacques in 1947 in the US, where they had four children. Also that year, he changed his surname to Stuart-Houston; some have commented on its similarity with the name of the racialist writer Houston Stewart Chamberlain. Their children, Alexander Adolf Stuart-Houston (b. 1949), Louis Stuart-Houston (b. 1951), Howard "Howie" Ronald Stuart-Houston (1957–1989), and Brian William Stuart-Houston (b. 1965), have not had any children.

Howard, an IRS agent of 18 months, was the only one of the siblings who ever married (having wedded a woman named Marie), and he intended to have children. He died unexpectedly, however, on 14 September 1989 in a head-on collision, leaving behind no children. Howard had been driving eastbound on Route 25 when, at around 5:50 p.m., a car headed west on his lane crashed into his vehicle. The other driver was determined to be Eugene W. Griffin, age 18, of Flanders. Griffin had four passengers, those being 18-year-old William Kubik of Patchogue; Anna Wheeler and Michael Mujsce, both age 18 and from Riverhead; and 17-year-old William Eickholz of Wading River. All five of them were injured in the crash and were taken to receive medical treatment at Stony Brook University Hospital, where Stuart-Houston was pronounced dead. Both vehicles were impounded by the Suffolk County Police, though no one was charged on the day the incident occurred.

According to David Gardner, author of the 2001 book The Last of the Hitlers, "They didn't sign a pact, but what they did is, they talked amongst themselves, talked about the burden they've had in the background of their lives, and decided that none of them would marry, none of them would have children. And that's a pact they've kept to this day." Though none of Stuart-Houston's sons have had children, his son Alexander, a social worker since 2002, said that contrary to this speculation, there was no intentional pact to end the Hitler bloodline.

=== Alleged sons ===
==== With Charlotte Lobjoie ====
It was alleged that Hitler had a son, Jean-Marie Loret, with a Frenchwoman named Charlotte Lobjoie. Jean-Marie Loret was born in March 1918 and died in 1985, aged 67. Loret married several times, and had as many as nine children. His family's lawyer has suggested that, if their descent from Hitler could be proven, they may be able to claim royalties for Hitler's book, Mein Kampf. However, several historians, such as Anton Joachimsthaler, and Ian Kershaw, say that Hitler's paternity is unlikely or impossible to prove, although DNA testing in comparison to a surviving known relative of Adolf Hitler could resolve this. It was noted that the two shared a strong physical resemblance.

Belgian journalist Jean-Paul Mulders collected DNA samples from known Hitler relatives and stamps asserted used by J. M. Loret. Results concluded there were no common ancestors between the two lineages.

==== With Unity Mitford ====
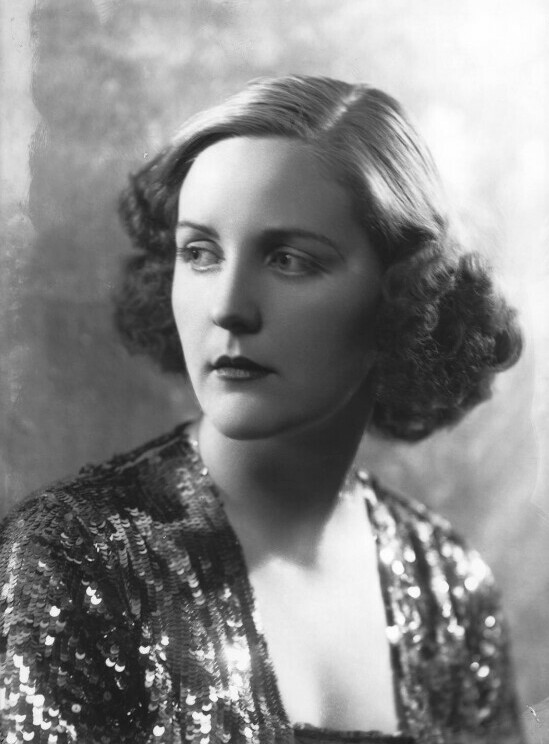
Unity Mitford in 1937

Hitler has also been alleged to have had a son with Unity Mitford, a British socialite who had been within Hitler's inner circle. Following Mitford's attempted suicide and return to the United Kingdom, she spent time at Hill View Cottage, a private maternity home in Oxfordshire. The theory alleges that Hitler and Mitford had a much closer relationship than previously known, and that Mitford was in fact pregnant and had given birth to Hitler's son, who was subsequently given up for adoption, and whose identity was protected.

Journalist Martin Bright, who had been contacted regarding this theory after publishing a previous article on Mitford, investigated the maternity home. Bright found that Hill View Cottage was used as a maternity home during the war and that the presence of Mitford was a consistent rumour throughout the village. A look through the birth records at the Oxfordshire register office was also consistent with what Bright's contact had claimed about the maternity home, including that it had been managed by their aunt Betty Norton, but there was no record of Mitford having been at the home. A lack of recordkeeping at the home was not uncommon, as had been claimed by the records officer. Bright contacted the sister of Unity Mitford, Deborah, who was the last of the Mitford sisters still alive at the time. Deborah dismissed the theory of Hitler's baby as "gossip of villagers", but confirmed that Unity had stayed at the maternity home to recover from a nervous breakdown. Inquiring with the National Archives, Bright also found a file on Unity sealed under the 100-year rule. He received special permission to open it and discovered that in October 1941, Unity Mitford had been consorting with a married RAF test pilot, which Bright stated "was hard evidence that Unity might not have been quite the invalid it was supposed". The theory of Mitford giving birth to Hitler's baby was popularised by the Channel 4 documentary Hitler's British Girl, which covered Bright's investigation.

It had also been revealed that MI5 wished to interrogate her after her return to Britain, and it was only on the intervention of the Home Secretary John Anderson that she was not. The Evening Standard wrote of this theory that "Unity would have been happy to bear Hitler's child, preferably in wedlock rather than out of it. She never disguised her wish to marry the Führer." Unlike Loret, the identity of this alleged son or whether he even exists remains unknown and is nearly impossible to prove; for this reason many historians and those who knew Mitford personally have dismissed the allegation.

== List of family members ==
- Adolf Hitler (1889–1945)
- Eva Braun (1912–1945), wife
- Alois Hitler (Sr.) (né Schicklgruber) (1837–1903), father
- Klara Hitler (1860–1907), mother
- Alois Hitler Jr. (né Matzelsberger) (1882–1956), elder half-brother
- Angela Hitler (1883–1949), elder half-sister
- Four of Adolf's siblings died in infancy or early childhood of illnesses:

- Gustav Hitler (1885–1887), died of diphtheria
- Ida Hitler (1886–1888), died of diphtheria
- Otto Hitler (1887–1887)
- Edmund Hitler (1894–1900), died of measles

- Paula Hitler (1896–1960), younger sister and only full sibling to survive into adulthood
- Bridget Dowling (1891–1969), sister-in-law
- Geli Raubal (1908–1931), niece, committed suicide
- Gretl Braun (1915–1987), sister-in-law through Hitler's marriage to Eva Braun
- Heinz Hitler (1920–1942), nephew
- Ilse Braun (1909–1979), sister-in-law through Hitler's marriage to Eva Braun
- Johann Georg Hiedler (1792–1857), presumed paternal grandfather
- Johann Nepomuk Hiedler (1807–1888), maternal great-grandfather, presumed great uncle, and possibly Hitler's true paternal grandfather
- Leo Raubal Jr. (1906–1977), nephew
- Maria Schicklgruber (1795–1847), paternal grandmother
- Johanna Hiedler (1830–1906), maternal grandmother
- William Patrick Hitler (1911–1987), nephew, born in Liverpool, England

== Hitler family tree ==
Note: For simplicity, the first marriage of Alois Hitler (b. 1837) to Anna Glasl-Hörer along with his affair with Thekla Penz have been excluded, as have any marriages that may have occurred after 1945.

Stefan Hiedler (1672–?)	Agnes Capeller (1674–?)
Johann Hiedler (1725–?)	Maria Anna; Neugesch-wandter
Johannes Schicklgruber (1764–1847)	Theresia Pfeisinger (1769–1821)	Martin Hiedler (1762–1829)	Anna Maria Goschl (1760–1854)
Disputed paternity: Read details	Maria Schicklgruber (1795–1847)	Johann Georg Hiedler (1792–1857)	Lorenz Hiedler (1800–1861)	Johann Nepomuk Hiedler (1807–1888)	Eva Maria Decker (1792–1873)	Laurenz Pölzl (1788–1841)	Juliana Walli (1797–1831)
Walburga Hiedler (1832–1900)	Johanna Hiedler (1830–1906)	Johann Baptist Pölzl (1828–1902)
Franziska Matzelsberger (1861–84)	Alois Hitler (1837–1903)	Klara Pölzl (1860–1907)	Johanna Pölzl (1863–1911)	Theresia Pölzl (1868–1935)
Bridget Dowling (1891–1969)	Alois Hitler Jr. (1882–1956)	Hedwig Heidemann (1889–1966)	Leo Raubal Sr. (1879–1910)	Angela Hitler (1883–1949)	Martin Hammitzsch (1878–1945)	Gustav Hitler (1885–1887)	Otto Hitler (1887–1887)	Edmund Hitler (1894–1900)	Paula Hitler (1896–1960)
William Patrick Hitler (1911–1987)	Heinz Hitler (1920–1942)	Leo Rudolf Raubal Jr (1906–1977)	Geli Raubal (1908–1931)	Elfriede Raubal (1910–93)	Ida Hitler (1886–1888)	Adolf Hitler (1889–1945)	Eva Braun (1912–1945)

== Braun family tree ==
Note: For simplicity, the second marriages after 1945 of Ilse and Gretl have been excluded.

Friedrich Braun (1879–1964)	Franziska Kronberger (1885–1976)
Xaver Hofstätter	Ilse Braun (1909–1979)	Adolf Hitler (1889–1945)	Eva Braun (1912–1945)	Gretl Braun (1915–1987)	Hermann Fegelein (1906–1945)
Eva Barbara Fegelein (1945–1971)

== Sources ==
- Allen, Peter (17 February 2012). "Hitler Had Son With French Teen". The Daily Telegraph.
- "Hitler Relatives Allegedly Arrested". Associated Press. 18 July 1998. Archived from the original on 13 September 2018.
- Bailey, Ronald Albert (1981). Prisoners of War. Alexandria, Virginia: Time-Life Books. ISBN 0-8094-3391-5.
- "Nazis 'gassed Hitler's relative'". BBC. 19 January 2005.
- Beevor, Antony (2002). Berlin: The Downfall 1945. London: Viking-Penguin Books. ISBN 978-0-670-03041-5.
- Boulton, Terynn (15 October 2013). "The End of Hitler's Family Line – the Pact Between the Sons of Hitler's Nephew Never to Have Children". Today I Found Out.
- Bright, Martin (13 December 2007). "Unity Mitford and 'Hitler's baby'". The New Statesman.
- Bullock, Alan (1962) [1952]. Hitler: A Study in Tyranny. London: Penguin Books. LCCN 63005065.
- Bullock, Alan (1999) [1952]. Hitler: A Study in Tyranny. New York: Konecky & Konecky. ISBN 978-1-56852-036-0.
- Bülow, Louis (2008). "Paula Hitler: Interrogation II". www.shoah.dk. Archived from the original on 21 January 2018.
- Bytwerk, Randall (1 December 2025) [2009]. "Facts and Lies about Hitler". Calvin University.
- Correspondent, J. (19 December 1997). "Russia Pardons Alleged Hitler Kin". J. The Jewish News of Northern California.
- Cramer, Philissa (12 November 2025). "Groundbreaking analysis of Hitler's DNA shows no Jewish ancestry — but finds a genetic disorder". Jewish Telegraphic Agency.
- Deighton, Len (1987). Winter: a Novel of a Berlin Family. New York: Knopf. ISBN 0-394-55177-X.
- Elliott, Mark R. (1982). Pawns of Yalta: Soviet Refugees and America's Role in Their Repatriation. Urbana: University of Illinois Press. ISBN 0-252-00897-9.
- Evans, R. J. (n.d.). The Third Reich in History and Memory. Oxford University Press. LCCN 2014038585. OL 20002303W.
- Heiden, Konrad (1975). Hitler: A Biography. New York: AMS Press. ISBN 0-404-56401-1.
- Fest, Joachim C. (1999). The Face of the Third Reich. New York: Da Capo Press. ISBN 978-0-306-80915-6.
- Fest, Joachim (1975). Hitler. New York: Vintage Books. ISBN 0-394-72023-7.
- Fuhrer, Armin (16 May 2021). "Seine Kneipe war beliebter Nazi-Treffpunkt: Das bewegte Leben von Hitlers Halbbruder Alois" [His Pub Was a Popular Nazi Meeting Place: the Eventful Life of Hitler's Half-brother Alois]. Focus (in German).
- Gardner, David (20 January 2002). "Getting to know the Hitlers". The Daily Telegraph.
- Görtemaker, Heike B. (2011). Eva Braun: Life with Hitler. New York: Alfred A. Knopf. ISBN 978-0-307-59582-9.
- Gottschald, Max (1954). Deutsche Namenkunde [German Onomastics]. Berlin: Walter de Gruyter u. Co.
- Gunther, John (1940). Inside Europe. New York: Harper & Brothers.
- Hamann, Brigitte; Mommsen, Hans (2010). Hitler's Vienna: a Portrait of the Tyrant As a Young Man. Tauris Parke Paperbacks. ISBN 978-1-84885-277-8.
- Hauner, Milan (1983). Hitler: A Chronology of his Life and Time. London: Macmillan. ISBN 0-333-30983-9.
- "Hitler Relatives Vindicated". The Independent. Associated Press. 7 April 1998.
- Jamieson, Alastair (19 November 2008). "Nazi leader Hitler really did have only one ball". The Daily Telegraph.
- Jetzinger, Franz (1976) [1956]. Hitler's Youth. Westport, Connecticut: Greenwood Press. ISBN 978-0-8371-8617-7.
- Joachimsthaler, Anton Herbig (1989). Korrektur einer Biographie. Adolf Hitler, 1908–1920 [Emendation of a Biography. Adolf Hitler, 1908–1920] (in German). Munich: Herbig. ISBN 3776615753. LCCN 90138725. OCLC 21006341. OL 1925659M.
- Keegan, John (1987). The Mask of Command: A Study of Generalship. London: Pimlico. ISBN 978-0-7126-6526-1.
- Kershaw, Ian (1999). Hitler 1889–1936: Hubris. W. W. Norton. ISBN 0-393-04671-0.
- Kershaw, Ian (2001). Hitler 1889–1936: Hubris. Penguin. ISBN 978-0-14-192579-0.
- Kershaw, Ian (2008). Hitler: A Biography. New York City: W. W. Norton & Company. ISBN 978-0-393-06757-6. LCCN 2008037294. OCLC 1285564274. OL 22551194M. Wikidata Q138306767.
- Khan, Frank; Wilson, Catherine (15 July 2000). "Irish Hitlers". Irish Independent.
- Klein, Dirk de (16 July 2024). "Heinz Hitler: Nephew of Evil". History of Sorts. Archived from the original on 16 July 2024.
- Langer, Walter C. (1972). The Mind of Adolf Hitler: The Secret Wartime Report. New York City: Basic Books. ISBN 978-0-465-04620-1. LCCN 72086336. OCLC 420612. OL 21202347M. Wikidata Q135406674.
- Langton, James (16 July 2000). "Hitler's lost relatives found on Long Island - 'in terror of identification'". The Telegraph.
- Maye, Brian (18 November 2019). "An Irishman's Diary on Bridget Dowling, Hitler's Sister-in-law". The Irish Times.
- McCarthy, Tony (1992). "Hitler: His Irish Relatives". Irish Roots Magazine. No. 1, 1992 First Quarter. Archived from the original on 10 April 2006.
- McKale, Donald (2011). Nazis After Hitler: How Perpetrators of the Holocaust Cheated Justice and Truth. Rowman & Littlefield. ISBN 978-1-4422-1318-0.
- Murphy, Francois (30 May 2016). King, Larry (ed.). "Hitler's Older Brother Was in Fact Younger and Died Early, Historian Says". Reuters.
- "Hitler had geen joods bloed en geen Franse zoon" [Hitler Had No Jewish Blood and No French Son]. Nieuwsblad (in Dutch). 24 April 2008. Archived from the original on 19 March 2018.
- "A Psychological Analysis of Adolph Hitler. His Life and Legend". Nizkor Project. Hitler As He Knows Himself. Archived from the original on 8 October 1999.
- "Special Agent Howard R. Stuart-Houston". Officer Down Memorial Page.
- Parsons, Chris (1 May 2014). "How Hitler's Half-brother Lived in a Liverpool Terrace - Before It Was Bombed by the Germans". Yahoo News.
- Pearce, Vanessa; Harby, Jennifer (29 April 2017). "When Adolf Hitler Confidante Unity Mitford Came to Stay". BBC News.
- Pitogo, Heizel (13 April 2016). "Is This the End of Hitler's Bloodline?". War History Online.
- Roberts, Jeremy (2001). Adolf Hitler: a Study in Hate. The Rosen Publishing Group. ISBN 978-0-8239-3317-4.
- Rosenbaum, Ron (1998). "Chapter 1: The Mysterious Stranger, the Serving Girl, and the Family Romance of the Hitler Explainers". Explaining Hitler: The Search for the Origins of His Evil – via The New York Times.
- Rosenbaum, Ron (2014). Explaining Hitler. Da Capo Press. ISBN 978-0306823183.
- Rosenberg, Jennifer (27 September 2018). "Adolf Hitler's Family Tree". ThoughtCo. Archived from the original on 14 March 2025.
- Rosmus, Anna (2015). Hitlers Nibelungen (in German). Grafenau: Samples. ISBN 9783938401323.
- Ryback, Timothy W. (10 July 2000). "Hitler's Lost Family". The New Yorker. ISSN 0028-792X.
- Ryback, Timothy W. (2 May 2004). "Hitlers Familienbande". Cicero. Archived from the original on 22 September 2009.
- Sandgruber, Roman (31 August 2024). "Hitlers unbekannter Stiefbruder" [Hitler's Unknown Step-Brother]. Oberösterreichische Nachrichten (in German). Archived from the original on 1 September 2024.
- Serena, Katie (30 April 2025). Kuroski, John (ed.). "What Happened to Adolf Hitler's Family? Meet the Descendants of the Führer". All That's Interesting.
- Shirer, William Lawrence (1960). The Rise and Fall of the Third Reich: A History of Nazi Germany. New York City: Simon & Schuster. ASIN B0766DKDLR. LCCN 60006729. OCLC 1286630. OL 5794925M. Wikidata Q138029595.
- Smith, Bradley F. (1967). Adolf Hitler: His Family, Childhood and Youth. Hoover Instituted. ISBN 0-8179-1622-9.
- Smith, Candace (21 February 2012). "Did Hitler Have a Secret Son? Evidence Supports Alleged Son's Claims". ABC News.
- "Hitler: Kein Ariernachweis" [Hitler: No Aryan proof]. Der Spiegel (in German). 11 June 1957. "Fest steht, daß Adolf Hitler den Ariernachweis, den er den meisten Deutschen abverlangte, für seine Person kaum hätte erbringen können. Sein Großvater väterlicherseits ist unbekannt." [It is certain that Adolf Hitler would not have been able to provide the proof of Aryan ancestry, which he demanded of most Germans, for his own person. His paternal grandfather is unknown.]
- "Dichte Inzucht" [Close Inbreeding]. Der Spiegel (in German). Vol. 31. 23 July 1967.
- "The Truth About Hitler's British Love Child". The Standard. 12 April 2012.
- Steiner, John Michael (1976). Power Politics and Social Change in National Socialist Germany: A Process of Escalation into Mass Destruction. The Hague: Mouton. ISBN 978-90-279-7651-2.
- Toland, John (1976). Adolf Hitler: The Definitive Biography. Doubleday. ISBN 978-0-385-42053-2.
- Tolstoy, Nikolai (1978). The Secret Betrayal. New York: Scribner. ISBN 0-684-15635-0.
- Udolph, Jürgen [in German]; Fitzek, Sebastian (2005). Professor Udolphs Buch der Namen. Woher sie kommen. Was sie bedeuten [Professor Udolph's Book of Names. Where They Come From. What They Mean] (in German). Munich: C. Bertelsmann. ISBN 978-3-570-00879-9.
- Schaeffer, Tony (15 September 1989). "Fatal Crash in Lake Grove". Newsday (Suffolk Edition). p. 13.
- Ullrich, Volker (2017). Hitler: Ascent 1889–1939. Translated by Jefferson Chase. New York: Vintage. ISBN 978-1-101-87205-5.
- "Man Who Claimed to Be Hitler's Son Dies". UPI. 13 February 1985.
- "Interview with Paula Wolff". Unified School District 230. 12 July 1945. Archived from the original on 16 February 2007.
- Waite, Robert G. L. (1993) [1977]. The Psychopathic God. Da Capo Press. ISBN 0-306-80514-6.
- "Paula Hitler". The Washington Post. Associated Press. 3 June 1960. Archived from the original on 4 March 2016.
- Weber, Thomas (2010). Hitler's First War: Adolf Hitler, The Men of the List Regiment, and the First World War. Oxford; New York: Oxford University Press. ISBN 978-0-19-923320-5.
- Wordsworth, Araminta (17 February 2012). "Is Jean-marie Loret Hitler's Long Lost Son?". National Post.
- Yeoman, Fran (13 December 2007). "Did Unity Mitford have Adolf Hitler's love child?". The Times. London.
- Zalampas, Sherree Owens (1990). Adolf Hitler: A Psychological Interpretation of His Views on Architecture, Art, and Music. Bowling Green University. ISBN 978-0-87972-488-7.
- Zdral, Wolfgang [in German] (2005). Die Hitlers: Die unbekannte Familie des Führers (in German). Frankfurt: Campus-Verlag. ISBN 3-593-37457-9. LCCN 2005424711. OCLC 58421812. OL 18485679M. Wikidata Q138798162.
- Gardner, David (6 July 2015). "Meet the Hitlers: Great-nephew of Adolf revealed as a tax inspector ca". Express.co.uk.
