= Heinz Hitler =

Nephew of Adolf Hitler (1920–1942)

- Hitler in uniform during the war
- Born: Heinrich Hitler; 14 March 1920; Magdeburg, Germany
- Died: 21 February 1942 (aged 21); Moscow, Soviet Union
- Relatives: William Patrick Hitler (half-brother); Adolf Hitler (half-uncle); Leo Raubal Jr. (cousin); Paula Hitler (half-aunt); Geli Raubal (cousin); Angela Hitler (aunt)
- Military career
- Allegiance: Nazi Germany
- Branch: Army
- Service years: 1939–1942
- Rank: Unteroffizier
- Nickname: Heinz
- Conflicts: World War II; Operation Barbarossa; Battle of Moscow (POW)
- Awards: Iron Cross 2nd Class

Heinrich "Heinz" Hitler (14 March 1920 – 21 February 1942) was a German soldier who was the half-nephew of Adolf Hitler and the younger half brother of William Stuart-Houston.

Heinrich Hitler was born on 14 March 1920 in Magdeburg, Germany. He was the son of Alois Hitler Jr. and his second wife Hedwig Heidemann, whom he had married bigamously. He has an adopted sister. He was the younger half-brother of William Stuart-Houston who was from his father's previous marriage. Unlike his brother William, Heinz was a strong supporter of the Nazis and Adolf Hitler reportedly called him his favorite nephew. He attended the National Political Institutes of Education (Napola) at Ballenstedt from 1935 to 1939. After obtaining his Abitur, he joined the Wehrmacht aspiring to become an officer. Heinz became a Unteroffizier with the 23rd Potsdamer Artillery Regiment in 1941 and participated in Operation Barbarossa, serving on the Eastern Front as a radio operator for Army Group Centre. Allegedly, Heinz had insisted on serving on the front line against the wishes of his uncle Adolf.

On 10 January 1942, after a retreat by the Wehrmacht, Heinz was ordered to recover radio equipment from an abandoned post. He was captured by Red Army forces during the mission and was taken to the Butyrka military prison in Moscow. On 21 February 1942, at the age of 21, Heinz died at the prison from unknown causes and his remains were lost.

== See also ==
- Adolf Hitler
- Hitler Family
- Yakov Dzhugashvili
