= Angela Raubal =

Angela Raubal may refer to:

- Angela Hitler, married name Angela Raubal, (1883 − 1949), half-sister of Adolf Hitler
- Geli Raubal, full name Angela Raubal, (1908 − 1931), daughter of Leo and Angela (Hitler) Raubal and possible lover of her mother's half brother, Adolf Hitler
