= Weitra =

- Municipality
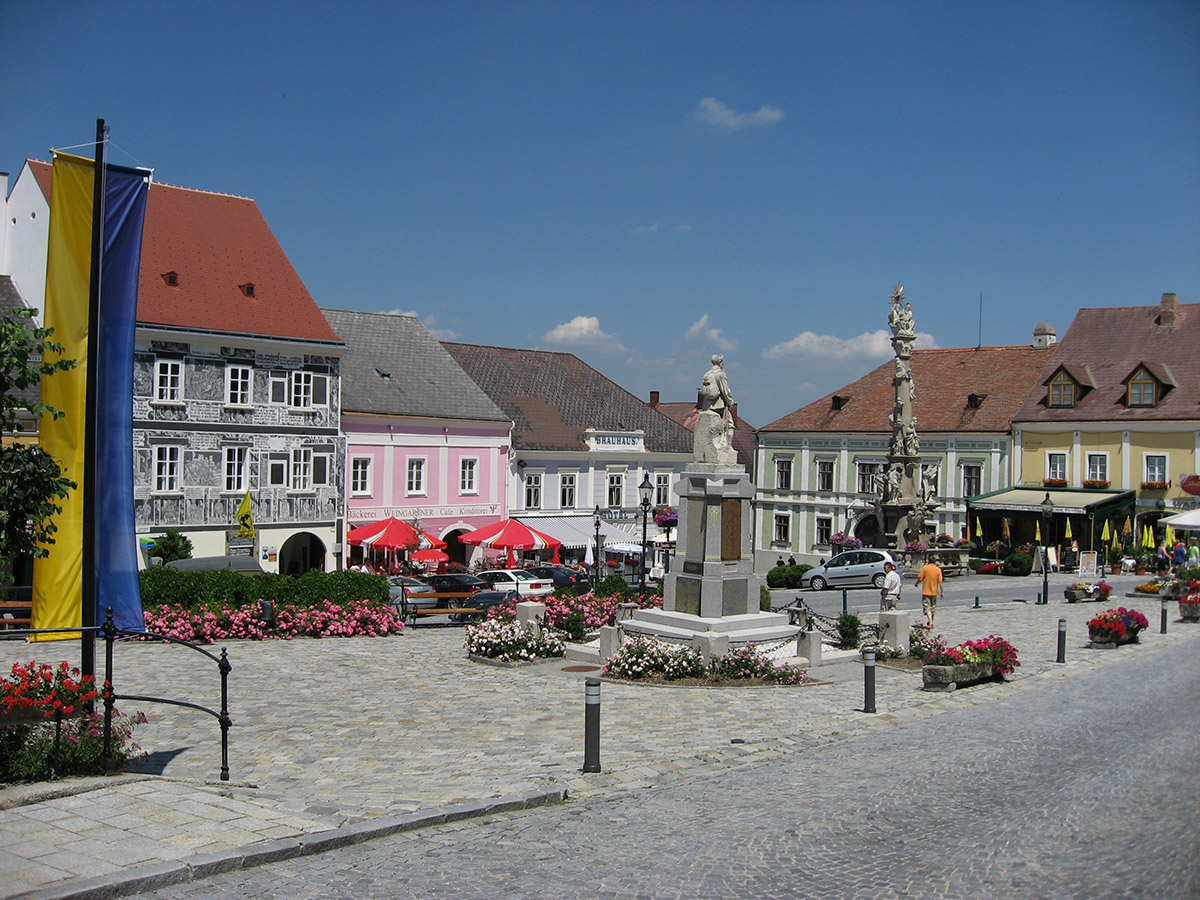
- Main square

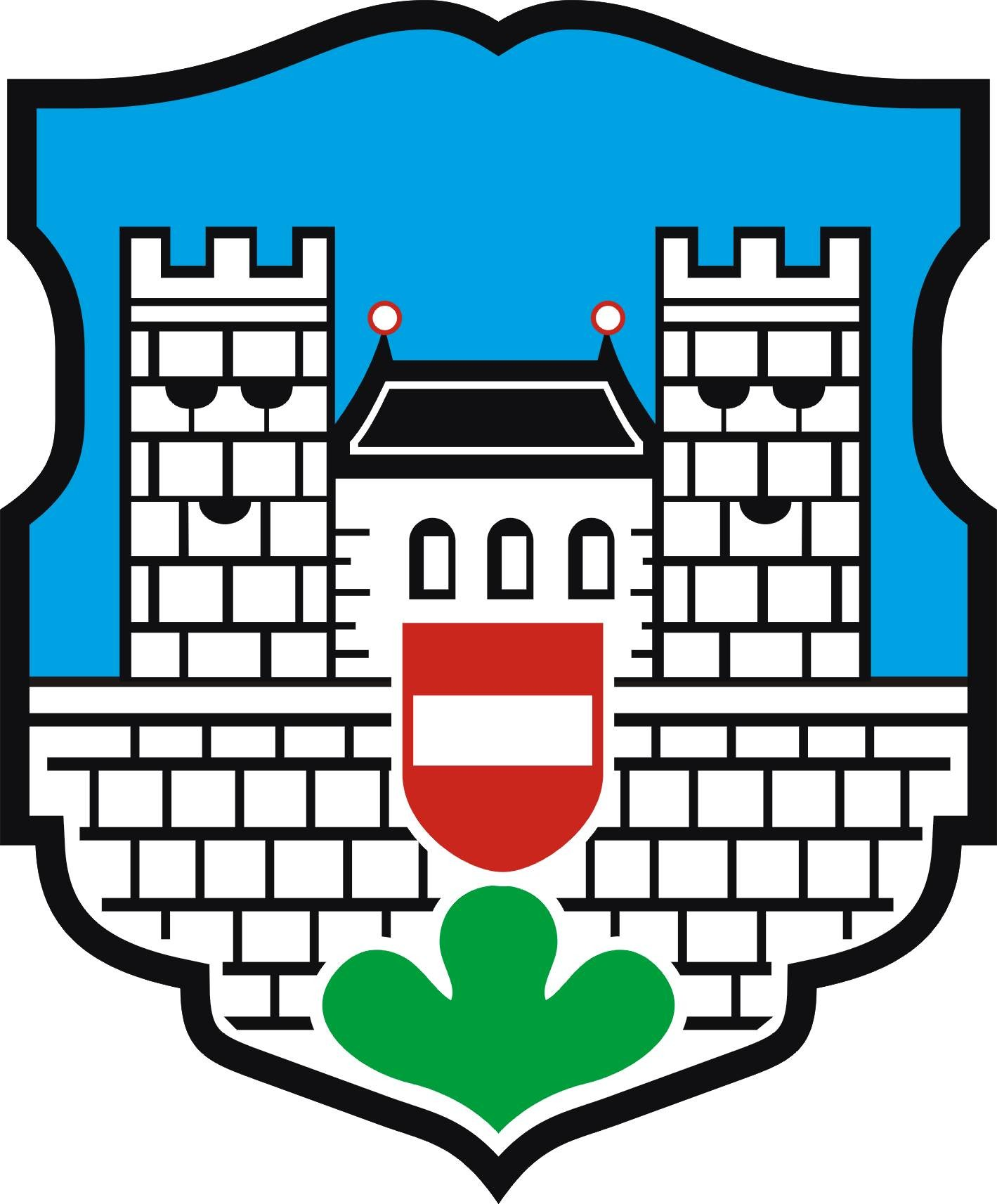
- Coat of arms

- Location within Austria
- Coordinates: 48°42′N 14°54′E
- Country: Austria
- State: Lower Austria
- District: Gmünd

Government
  - Mayor: Patrick Layr (ÖVP)

Area
  - Total: 52.54 km^{2} (20.29 sq mi)
- Elevation: 562 m (1,844 ft)

Population (2018-01-01)
  - Total: 2,693
  - Density: 51.26/km^{2} (132.8/sq mi)
- Time zone: UTC+1 (CET)
  - Summer (DST): UTC+2 (CEST)
- Postal code: 3970
- Area code: 02856
- Website: www.weitra.gv.at

Weitra (Austrian German: [ˈvaɪtra]; Czech: Vitoraz) is a small town in the district of Gmünd in the Austrian state of Lower Austria.

== Geography ==
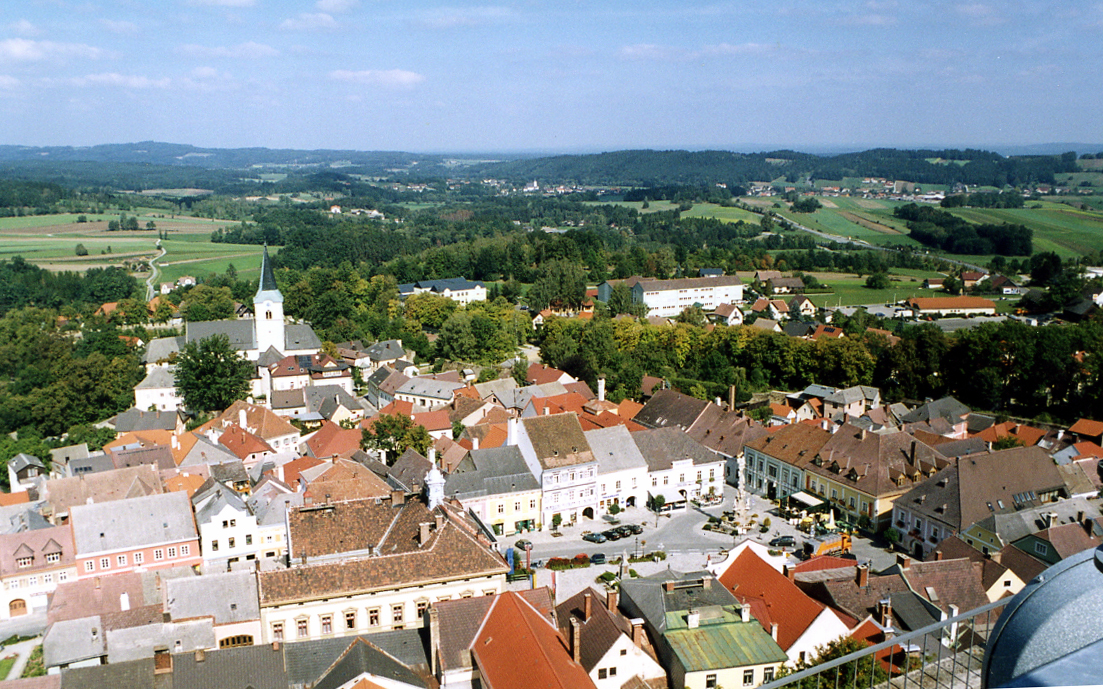
Townscape, view from the castle

The municipality is situated amidst the extended forests of the rural Waldviertel region, close to the border with the Czech Republic. It is located on the upper Lainsitz (Lužnice) river, a tributary of the Vltava (Moldau) north of the European watershed. The town's economy mainly relies on agriculture and forestry, but also on summer tourism.

Weitra consists of the cadastral communities of Brühl, Großwolfgers, Oberwindhag, Reinprechts, Spital, St. Wolfgang, Sulz, Walterschlag, Weitra proper, and Wetzles.

== History ==
A first castle at Weitra was built from about 1201 onwards at the behest of the Austrian noble Hadmar II of Kuenring, also owner of Dürnstein Castle where King Richard the Lionheart was imprisoned in the winter of 1192/93. The Kuenring (or Kühnring) family of ministeriales had acquired the originally Bohemian estates in 1185; they fell from grace after the extinction of the Austrian ducal House of Babenberg in 1246, as they had sided with King Ottokar II of Bohemia against the rising Habsburg dynasty. Ottokar was defeated by the Habsburg king Rudolf I of Germany at the 1278 Battle on the Marchfeld, and Rudolph's son, Duke Albert I of Austria, finally seized Weitra in 1296. A city wall was first mentioned in the late 13th century.

Weitra Castle

The fortress on the Bohemian border was besieged by Hussite forces as well as by Hungarian troops under Matthias Corvinus in 1486. In 1581, the Habsburg emperor Rudolf II enfeoffed Weitra to his chamberlain Wolf Rumpf who had the medieval castle rebuilt in its present Renaissance style. In 1607, the Swabian count Frederick IV of Fürstenberg, husband of Rumpf's widow, inherited the fief. During the Thirty Years' War, the castle was again attacked by Swedish forces under General Lennart Torstenson in 1645. After several blazes, the owners of the Fürstenberg-Weitra cadet branch had parts of the castle rebuilt in a Baroque design. The comital (from 1664 princely) House of Fürstenberg held the extended Weitra estates until the Revolutions of 1848. Up to today, the noble family owns the castle, which was extensively restored in 1994.

Beside its historic textile industry, Weitra is known as the oldest beer-producing site in Austria with several breweries documented since the 14th century. In 1903, the town received access to a narrow gauge railway line to Gmünd, since 2001 run as a heritage railway. After World War II, the economy suffered from the town's peripheral location near the Iron Curtain. Since 1959, Weitra houses a garrison of the Austrian Armed Forces.

== Politics ==
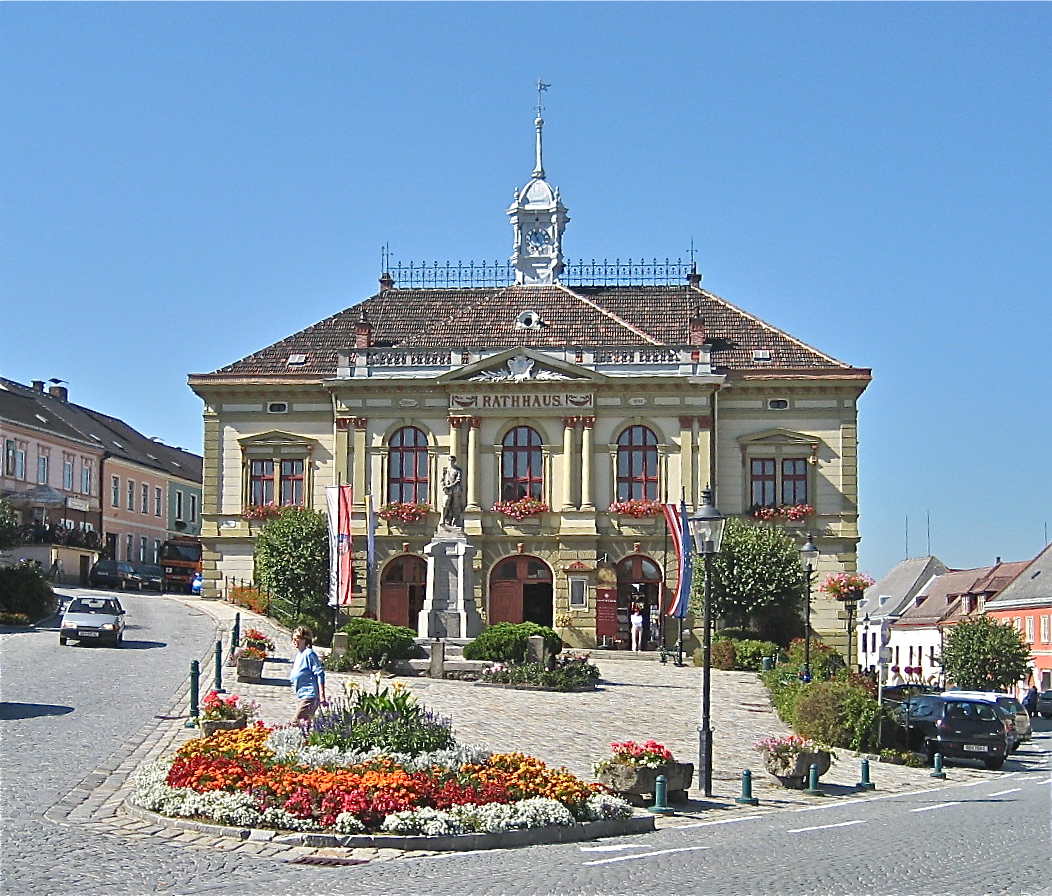
Town hall

Seats in the municipal council (Gemeinderat) as of 2020 elections:

- Austrian People's Party (ÖVP): 16
- Social Democratic Party of Austria (SPÖ): 3
- Freedom Party of Austria (FPÖ): 2

== Notable people ==
- Hiedler/Hitler family
  - Klara Hitler née Pölzl (1860–1907), mother of Adolf Hitler, 1860 in the hamlet of Spital. She was the daughter of Johanna Hiedler (1830−1906), a local peasant woman, and by her maternal grandfather Johann Nepomuk Hiedler (1807−1888) a distant cousin of her later husband Alois Hitler from nearby Strones, Döllersheim. Alois Hitler also lived in Spital between 1847-1850, raised by Johann Nepomuk Hiedler after his mother's death as a ten-year-old.
  - Johann Georg Hiedler, an Austrian official and possible grandfather of Adolf Hitler.
  - Johanna Hiedler, the maternal grandmother of Adolf Hitler.
  - Johann Nepomuk Hiedler, the possible grandfather of Adolf Hitler.
- Ludwig and Maria Knapp, owners of a sawmill and a farm in Weitra, declared Righteous Among the Nations by Israel's Yad Vashem.
