= Leonard Sax =

American psychologist and physician

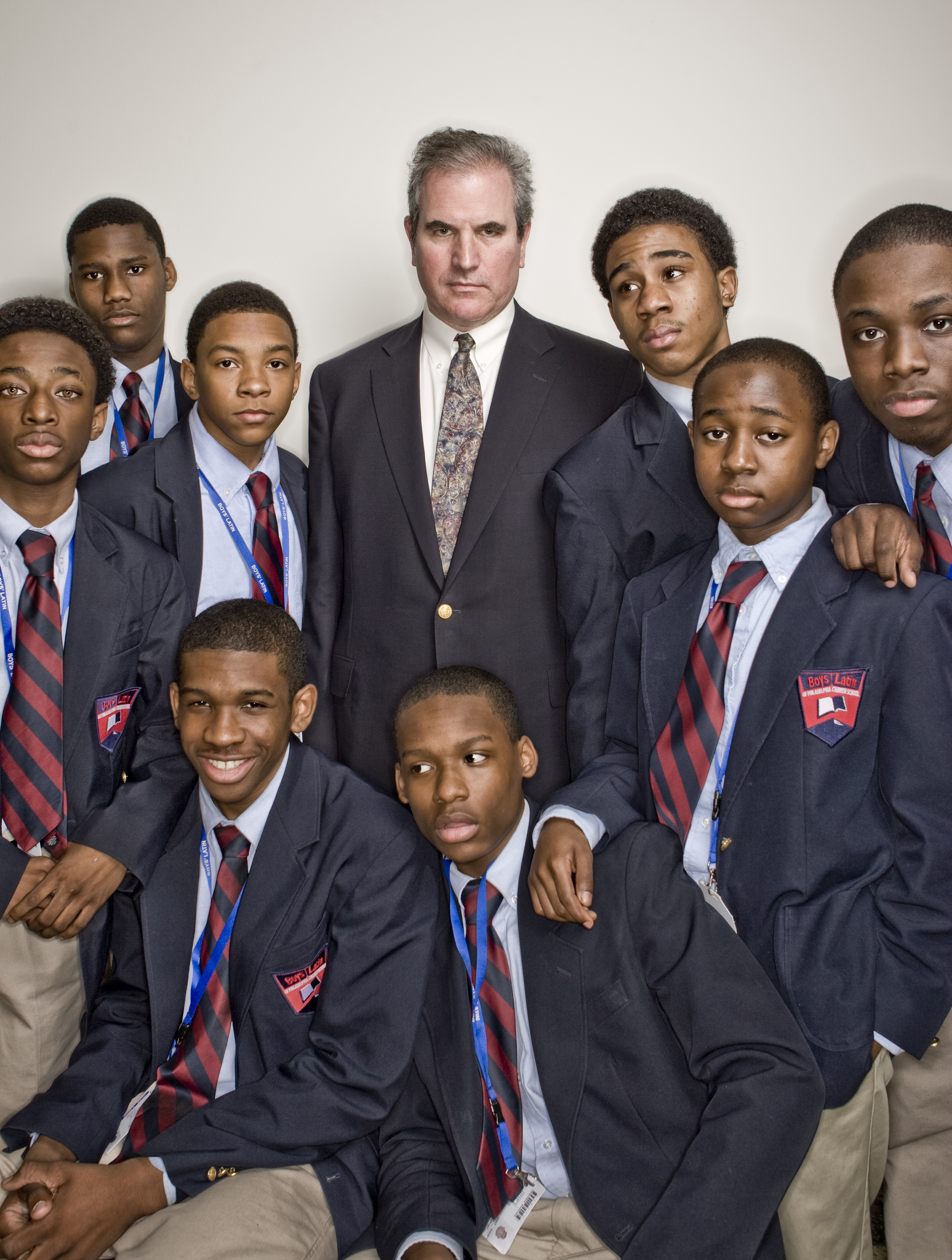
- Sax with high school students, 2009
- Born: Shaker Heights, Ohio, U.S.
- Education: Massachusetts Institute of Technology (BS); University of Pennsylvania (MD, PhD)

Leonard Sax is an American psychologist and family physician. He is the author of four books for parents: Boys Adrift, Girls on the Edge, Why Gender Matters, and The Collapse of Parenting. According to his website, he is currently employed as a physician at a healthcare facility in Chester County, Pennsylvania, where he also resides.

== Early life and education ==
Sax grew up in Shaker Heights, Ohio, born to a Jewish mother Dr. Janet B. Sax (nee Berman), where he was the third of three children. Sax graduated Phi Beta Kappa from the Massachusetts Institute of Technology (MIT) in 1980 with a bachelor's degree in biology. He completed a combined M.D.-Ph.D. program at the University of Pennsylvania in 1986. His Ph.D. is in psychology. He completed the three-year residency in family practice at Lancaster General Hospital in 1989.

== Career ==
In 1990, he founded Poolesville Family Practice, a primary care practice in Montgomery County, Maryland. He began an extended sabbatical from medical practice in June 2008. In December 2013, he returned to full-time clinical practice as an employee of Lancaster General Health. He has written several books and held workshops at institutions such as University of Wisconsin and First Presbyterian Church.

Sax's work has attracted most attention, positive and negative, for his views on gender. Broadly, he supports the notion of innate differences between the sexes, and advocates parenting children differently based on their gender. A cover story for Time magazine on March 7, 2005, included this statement:

"Until recently, there have been two groups of people: those who argue sex differences are innate and should be embraced and those who insist that they are learned and should be eliminated by changing the environment. Sax is one of the few in the middle – convinced that boys and girls are innately different and that we must change the environment so differences don't become limitations."

On his website, Sax says that he wrote Boys Adrift and Girls on the Edge because he is concerned about

"... a growing proportion of girls who are anxious, depressed, and tired; girls who can tell you a great deal about what they do but not so much about who they are. Likewise, we find a growing proportion of boys who are disengaged not only from school but from the real world. Those boys are comfortable in the virtual world, where they play their online video games, and/or surf the net for photographs of girls."

=== Why Gender Matters (2005) ===
Mark Liberman, a professor of linguistics and computer science at the University of Pennsylvania, questioned on his blog, Language Log, many of the claims which Sax made in his first book Why Gender Matters. Liberman asserted that there were serious problems with Sax's claims about sex differences in hearing, vision, and connections between emotions and language. Sax wrote to Liberman, and, receiving no reply, in October 2010 on the website of Why Gender Matters, Sax acknowledged that points in his book were "out-of-date or inaccurate" and that his work, which was initially published in 2005, has been clarified by studies published by third parties in 2007 and 2009. He now provides updated references to scholarly papers on these three issues and he "expanded, updated, and corrected" the discussion of sex differences in hearing with a new article, "Sex Differences in Hearing", in October 2010; and the discussion of sex differences in vision is updated in Chapter 5 of his book Girls on the Edge. Sax provides a detailed refutation of Liberman and other critics in two appendices to the 2017 edition of Why Gender Matters, titled "Sex Differences in Hearing" and "Sex Differences in Vision."

Conservative opinion columnist David Brooks calls Dr. Sax's first book, Why Gender Matters, "... a lucid guide to male and female brain differences."

=== Boys Adrift (2007) ===
Sax's second book, Boys Adrift, was reviewed by the Journal of the American Medical Association (JAMA) in December 2007. According to the review, Boys Adrift is "powerfully and persuasively presented", and provides "excellent and informative references and information". The review concludes that

"Boys Adrift is at its strongest in providing practical advice to parents about how to increase their sons' academic motivation; how to set appropriate limits on video game use; and how to protect their sons from the potential harm of psychotropic medications and environmental estrogens. Boys Adrift is at its weakest in supporting the thesis that there is an epidemic of unmotivated and underachieving young men."

=== Girls on the Edge (2010) ===
Sax's third book Girls on the Edge was reviewed by Library Journal which called the book "... essential reading for parents and teachers, and one of the most thought-provoking books on teen development available.” Mark Bauerlein, professor at Emory University, reviewed Girls on the Edge for the Chronicle of Higher Education and called it "crucial" and said that "Parents of ‘tween’ and teen girls would do well to check this book." Booklist called Girls on the Edge "persuasive, often fascinating ... a holistic, sobering call to help the current generation of young women develop the support and sense of self that will allow them to grow into resilient adults.” According to a January 2011 review in The Atlantic magazine, Girls on the Edge is "... the best book about the current state of girls and young women in America."

=== The Collapse of Parenting (2015) ===
The fourth book of Sax, The Collapse of Parenting is about how increasingly children are becoming less respectful toward theirs parents and how parents are becoming more permissive in their parenting style. However, some have criticised the book, such as Melinda Wenner Moyer, writing for Slate, who believes that he relies too much on anecdotal evidence and ignores evidence that may be contrary to his claims. Still, many have praised the book, such as Cathy Gulli for Maclean’s, who believes that Sax’s approach to parenting would help with child development.

=== Single-sex education advocacy ===
Sax's advocacy of single-sex public education has also attracted criticism. In 2008, The New York Times Magazine published a piece written by freelancer Elizabeth Weil, about half of which is about Sax (the other half is about single-sex education at, for example, the Young Women's Leadership School in Harlem, New York City). The article asserts that "many academics and progressives tend to find Sax’s views stereotyped and infuriating". The article cites criticism by Michael Younger of the University of Cambridge as well as by Liberman. Sax responded on the NASSPE website that Weil's article is "awash in misrepresentations and distortions".

Sax' advocacy of single-sex education was also criticized in an article "The Pseudoscience of Single-Sex Schooling" by Diane F. Halpern and others.

=== National and international media ===
Sax has contributed articles and made appearances in the popular media in a number of English-speaking countries. In the United States, Sax was a guest on the Today show during February 2005 and July 2007. Matt Lauer interviewed Sax about the controversy surrounding boys' achievement, which was the topic of the cover story in Time that week. Al Roker interviewed Sax about his book Why Gender Matters. In Canada, Sax was a guest in the Toronto studio of the Canadian Broadcasting Corporation for an interview broadcast nationwide in January 2008. In Australia, Sax was a guest in the studio for the Today Show, interviewed by Jessica Rowe. In New Zealand, Sax was a studio guest of New Zealand's Channel One in May 2008 for a discussion of single-sex public education. In the United Kingdom, Sax was the subject of a full-page feature article in The Times.

In May 2010, Sax was a guest on CNN's American Morning, discussing his book Girls on the Edge and some of the challenges facing girls in the era of texting and Facebook. He returned as a guest on national television in New Zealand in August that year, discussing the girl-specific challenges of 'the cyberbubble'. He was again a guest on CNN's American Morning during the same month, discussing recent research suggesting that ADHD is overdiagnosed in American schoolchildren.

=== Article about Adolf Hitler's ancestry ===
In May 2019, Sax published an article entitled "Aus den Gemeinden von Burgenland: Revisiting the question of Adolf Hitler's paternal grandfather" which attempts to provide evidence that Hitler had Jewish ancestry and that was the reason for his antisemitism. Although most historians agree that there was no Jewish presence in Graz between the Jews' expulsion from the Styria region in Austria in the late 15th Century and the reestablishment of communal life in the 1860s, Sax claims that there were some Jews living in the region. Sax points out that many Jewish people lived in places without official sanction and demonstrated the existence of a settled Jewish community in Graz before the law formally permitted their residence, saying that "Contemporary historians have largely dismissed Frank's claim, primarily on the grounds that there were purportedly no Jews living in Graz in 1836, when Hitler's father Alois Schicklgruber was conceived. This consensus can be traced to a single historian, Nikolaus von Preradovich," a Nazi sympathizer, "who claimed that 'not a single Jew' (kein einziger Jude) was living in Graz prior to 1856. No independent scholarship has confirmed Preradovich's conjecture. In this paper, evidence is presented that there was in fact 'a small, now settled community' (eine kleine, nun angesiedelte Gemeinde) – of Jews living in Graz before 1850." And that "the hypothesis that Hitler's paternal grandfather was Jewish, as claimed by Hans Frank, may fit the facts better than the alternative hypothesis that Hitler's paternal grandfather was Johann Georg Hiedler or Johann Nepomuk Hiedler."

Sax said during an interview, "I argue that one factor driving his antisemitism was his intense need to prove that [he's] not Jewish." Sax has remarked about his research, "I have been thinking about the fact that neo-Nazis are offended by the suggestion that Hitler had a Jewish grandfather, because they hate Jews." He also said, "Jews are often offended by the suggestion that Hitler had a Jewish grandfather, because they hate Hitler. But now, as nearly a lifetime has passed since the end of the Third Reich, maybe we are free at last to ask — not what is offensive, or what is not offensive — but what is true? And what does it mean for our understanding of Adolf Hitler, and the Holocaust?"

British historian Richard J. Evans stated, "Even if there were Jews living in Graz in the 1830s, at the time when Adolf Hitler's father Alois was born, this does not prove anything at all about the identity of Hitler's paternal grandfather." And that "There is no contemporary evidence that Hitler's mother was ever in Graz, or that there was a Jewish family called Frankenberger living there. There was a family in Graz called Frankenreiter but it was not Jewish. No correspondence between Hitler's father or paternal grandmother has ever been found. Nor is there any evidence for Frank's claim that Hitler's half-nephew knew about it and was blackmailing Hitler, as Frank claimed." With regard to Sax's comments about his findings, Evans remarked, "Some people have found his deep and murderous anti-Semitism hard to explain unless there were personal motives behind it. This seems to be the motivation for Dr. Leonard Sax, a psychiatrist, not an historian, making his claims."

=== Popular press ===
- "Child psychiatry is sick with hidden conflicts of interest". New York Daily News. December 14, 2008. Archived from the original on December 17, 2008.
- "The boy problem: why so many boys think reading is stupid and school stinks" School Library Journal September 1, 2007.
- "Single-sex education: Separate but better?" Philadelphia Daily News, March 1, 2006.
- "The Promise and the Peril of Single-Sex PUBLIC Education". Education Week, March 2, 2005, pp. 48, 34, 35.
- "Too Few Women: Figure It Out". Los Angeles Times, January 23, 2005, p. M5.
- "Teens Will Speed. Let's Watch Them Do It". The Washington Post, November 28, 2004, p. B8.
- "The Odd Couple: Hillary Clinton & Kay Bailey Hutchison". The Women's Quarterly [the journal of the Independent Women's Forum], Summer 2002, pp. 14–16.
- "Single Sex Education: Ready for Prime Time?" The World & I, August 2002, pp. 257–269.
- "Rethinking Title IX" The Washington Times, July 2, 2001, p. A17.
- "Ritalin: Better living through chemistry?" The World & I, November 2000, 287–299.

=== Scholarly articles ===
- "Aus den Gemeinden von Burgenland: Revisiting the question of Adolf Hitler’s paternal grandfather." Journal of European Studies 2019: 49(2), 143–162. Aus den Gemeinden von Burgenland : Revisiting the question of Adolf Hitler’s paternal grandfather
- "Polyethylene terephthalate may yield endocrine disruptors." Environmental Health Perspectives, published April 2010, full text available online at NIH/NIEHS website.
- "Six Degrees of Separation: what teachers need to know about the emerging science of sex differences". Educational Horizons, Spring 2006, pp. 190–200.
- "The Diagnosis and Treatment of ADHD in Women". The Female Patient 29 (2004): 29–34.
- "Dietary Phosphorus Is Toxic for Girls But Not for Boys". In Victor Preedy (ed.) Annual Reviews in Food & Nutrition London, UK: Taylor & Francis Publishers, 2003, pp. 158–168.
- "Who First Suggests the Diagnosis of Attention-Deficit Hyperactivity Disorder? A survey of primary-care pediatricians, family physicians, and child psychiatrists". Annals of Family Medicine 1 (2003): 171–174. [With Kathleen J. Kautz]
- "What Was the Cause of Nietzsche's Dementia?" Journal of Medical Biography 11 (2003): 47–54.
- "How Common Is Intersex?" Journal of Sex Research 39 (2002): 174–178.
- "Maybe Men and Women Are Different". American Psychologist July (2002): 444–445.
- "The Institute of Medicine's "Dietary Reference Intake" for Phosphorus: a critical perspective". Journal of the American College of Nutrition 20 (2001): 271–278.
- "Reclaiming Kindergarten: making kindergarten less harmful to boys ". Psychology of Men and Masculinity 2 (2001): 3–12.
- "Characteristics of spatiotemporal integration in the priming and rewarding effects of medial forebrain bundle stimulation". Behavioral Neuroscience 105 (1991): 884–900. [With C. R. Gallistel]
- "Temporal integration in self-stimulation: a paradox". Behavioral Neuroscience 98 (1984): 467–468.
