= Johann Nepomuk Hiedler =

Ancestor of Adolf Hitler

- Born: 19 March 1807; Weitra, Austrian Empire
- Died: 17 September 1888 (aged 81); Weitra, Austria Hungary
- Other name: Johann Nepomuk Hüttler
- Occupation: Farmer
- Spouse: Eva Maria Hiedler (m. 1873, died)
- Children: Johanna Hiedler, Walburga Hüttler, Josefa Hüttler
- Relatives: Adolf Hitler (maternal great-grandson and possibly paternal grandnephew or grandson)

Johann Nepomuk Hiedler (19 March 1807 – 17 September 1888) was the maternal great-grandfather (Note: Adolf Hitler's mother was Klara, and Klara's mother was Johanna. Johanna and her sister Walburga were the children of Johann Nepomuk and his wife, Eva Maria Decker Hiedler.) and possibly also the paternal grandfather of Adolf Hitler. (Note: See the Hitler family trees (online and others) shown and cited in article on Johann Georg Hiedler.)

== Life ==
His first two names are the same as the name of the Bohemian Czech Saint Johann Nepomuk. Some people consider this name as evidence that Nepomuk (and therefore his great-grandson Adolf Hitler) had Czech ancestry. However, Johann Nepomuk, was an important saint for Bohemians of both Czech and German ethnicity, and also popular way beyond Bohemia. The name may also indicate only an association with someone else named Johann Nepomuk. Thus, there is no evidence that Hitler's ancestors were of Czech ancestry.

Johann Nepomuk became a relatively prosperous farmer and married Eva Maria Decker (16 December 1792 – 28 December 1873). The couple had three children together: Johanna Hiedler (19 January 1830 – 8 February 1906), Walburga Hüttler (11 April 1832 – 30 November 1900), Josefa Hüttler (15 February 1834 – 13 May 1859).

On 15 September 1848, Johanna married Johann Baptist Pölzl, a peasant farmer. The couple would eventually have five sons and six daughters, and only three of these children would survive to adulthood. Walburga married Josef Romeder (born in 1835) on 25 January 1853, but had no children. Josefa married Leopold Seiler (born 14 November 1832) on 1 March 1859, but had no children and died soon after on 13 May 1859.

Johann Nepomuk's wife, Eva Maria, died 28 December 1873, at the age 81 in Spital, Weitra. Johanna's daughter, Johann Nepomuk's granddaughter, Klara Polzl, would eventually become the third wife of Alois Hitler. Alois was the illegitimate son of Maria Schicklgruber, who had married Johann's older brother, Johann Georg Hiedler on 10 May 1842, who may in fact have been Alois' natural father. Alois would claim in his later life that Johann Georg Hiedler was not his stepfather, but in fact his biological father, since Johann Nepomuk informally adopted Alois during Alois' childhood. In June 1876, Johann and Alois both returned to Weitra and Johann testified before a Catholic notary that Johann Georg was Alois' biological father, who had abandoned the child and handed over his fatherhood responsibilities to Johann Nepomuk. On 6 January 1877, Alois was legitimized as 'Alois Hitler' and the priest then changed the details on the baptismal certificate from "Catholic, Male, Illegitimate" to "Johann Georg Hitler" under his father's name. However, it is also possible that Johann Nepomuk himself was, in fact, Alois' natural father but could not acknowledge this publicly due to his marriage.

Johann Nepomuk willed Alois a considerable portion of his life savings. Johann Nepomuk's granddaughter, Klara, had a protracted affair with Alois before marrying him on 7 January 1885 in Braunau Am Inn after Alois' second wife, Franziska Matzelsberger had died on 10 August 1884 from tuberculosis. Klara had six children with Alois, and gave birth to Adolf Hitler on 20 April 1889.

== See also ==
- Hitler family
