= Leo Raubal Jr. =

Adolf Hitler's half-nephew (1906–1977)

Leo Rudolf Raubal Jr.
- Born: 2 October 1906; Linz, Austria-Hungary
- Died: 18 August 1977 (aged 70); Spain
- Burial place: Linz
- Relatives: Angela Hitler (mother) Adolf Hitler (half-uncle)
- Military career
- Allegiance: Nazi Germany
- Branch: Luftwaffe
- Service years: 1939–1943
- Rank: Leutnant
- Conflicts: World War II: Eastern Front; Battle of Stalingrad (POW)

Leo Rudolf Raubal Jr. (2 October 1906 – 18 August 1977) was an Austrian engineer and teacher. He was the half-nephew of Adolf Hitler, and served in the German Luftwaffe during World War II.

== Life ==
Leo Raubal Jr. was born in Linz, Austria-Hungary, on 2 October 1906. He was the son of Leo Raubal Sr. and his wife Angela, Adolf's half-sister. In August 1910, when he was only 3 years old, he lost his father to tuberculosis. Raubal Jr. worked as an engineer and became a manager of the Linz Steelworks. He visited his mother sporadically while she was living in Berchtesgaden. Like his younger cousin Heinz Hitler but unlike his other younger cousin William Patrick Hitler, Leo Raubal was a "favorite nephew of the leader", and Adolf liked to spend his time with him. However, William claimed that Raubal did not like their uncle Adolf and blamed him for the death of his sister Geli. This contrasts with Raubal himself saying in 1967 that Adolf was "absolutely innocent" of Geli's death, according to historian Werner Maser.

=== World War II and detention in Moscow ===
In October 1939, Raubal was drafted into the Luftwaffe and was a lieutenant in the engineering corps. He looked similar to Adolf Hitler and sometimes served as his uncle's double during the war.

He was injured in January 1943 during the Battle of Stalingrad, and Friedrich Paulus asked Adolf for a plane to evacuate Raubal to Germany. Adolf refused and Raubal was captured by the Soviets on 31 January 1943. Adolf gave orders to examine the possibility of a prisoner exchange with the Soviets for Stalin's son Yakov Dzhugashvili, who had been captured by the Germans on 16 July 1941. Stalin refused to exchange him either for Raubal or for Friedrich Paulus, and said "war is war". Raubal was detained in Moscow's jails and was released by the Soviets on 28 September 1955, and returned to Austria.

=== Post-detention career ===
Raubal lived and worked in Salzburg as a teacher of chemistry. He died of tuberculosis during a vacation in Spain. He was buried on 7 September 1977 in Linz.

Leo Raubal Jr. had a son Peter (born 1931) who along with Elfriede Raubal's son, Heiner Hochegger (born 1945), and William Patrick Hitler's four sons, Alexander Adolf (born 1949), Louis (born 1951), Howard Ronald (1957–1989), and Brian William (born 1965), were the closest living relatives to Adolf Hitler. However, unlike Raubal, William Patrick, who fought with the United States during World War II and changed his last name to Stuart-Houston, was not on good terms with Adolf Hitler, publicly denouncing him by 1938.

== See also ==
- Hitler family

== Sources ==
- Werner Maser: Adolf Hitler. Mythos, Legende, Wirklichkeit, Bechtle, Munich 2001^{18}; ISBN 3-7628-0521-0
- Werner Maser: Fälschung, Dichtung und Wahrheit über Hitler und Stalin, Olzog, 2004, ISBN 3-7892-8134-4, page 272
- Joachimsthaler, Anton (2003). Hitlers Liste: Ein Dokument Personlicher Beziehungen. Herbig. p. 270. ISBN 3-7766-2328-4.
- Mayr, Walter (July 9, 2001). "SERIE - TEIL 10 HITLERS FRÜHE JAHRE - DER FÜHRER, MEIN ONKEL". Der Spiegel. No. 28/2001. p. 142.
- Marc Vermeeren: De jeugd van Adolf Hitler 1889–1907 en zijn familie en voorouders, Uitgeverij Aspekt, Soesterberg 2007, ISBN 90-5911-606-2
- Oliver Halmburger, Thomas Staehler: Familie Hitler. Im Schatten des Diktators, Oliver Halmburger Loopfilm GmbH, Munich, and ZDF-History, Mainz 2005 (film), DVD, ASIN B000U6SOKW
- Zdral, Wolfgang (2005). Die Hitlers. Campus Verlag GmbH. p. 237. ISBN 3-593-37457-9.
- Personal information from prof. Dr. Werner Maser (via German Wikipedia)
