= Döllersheim =

- Village
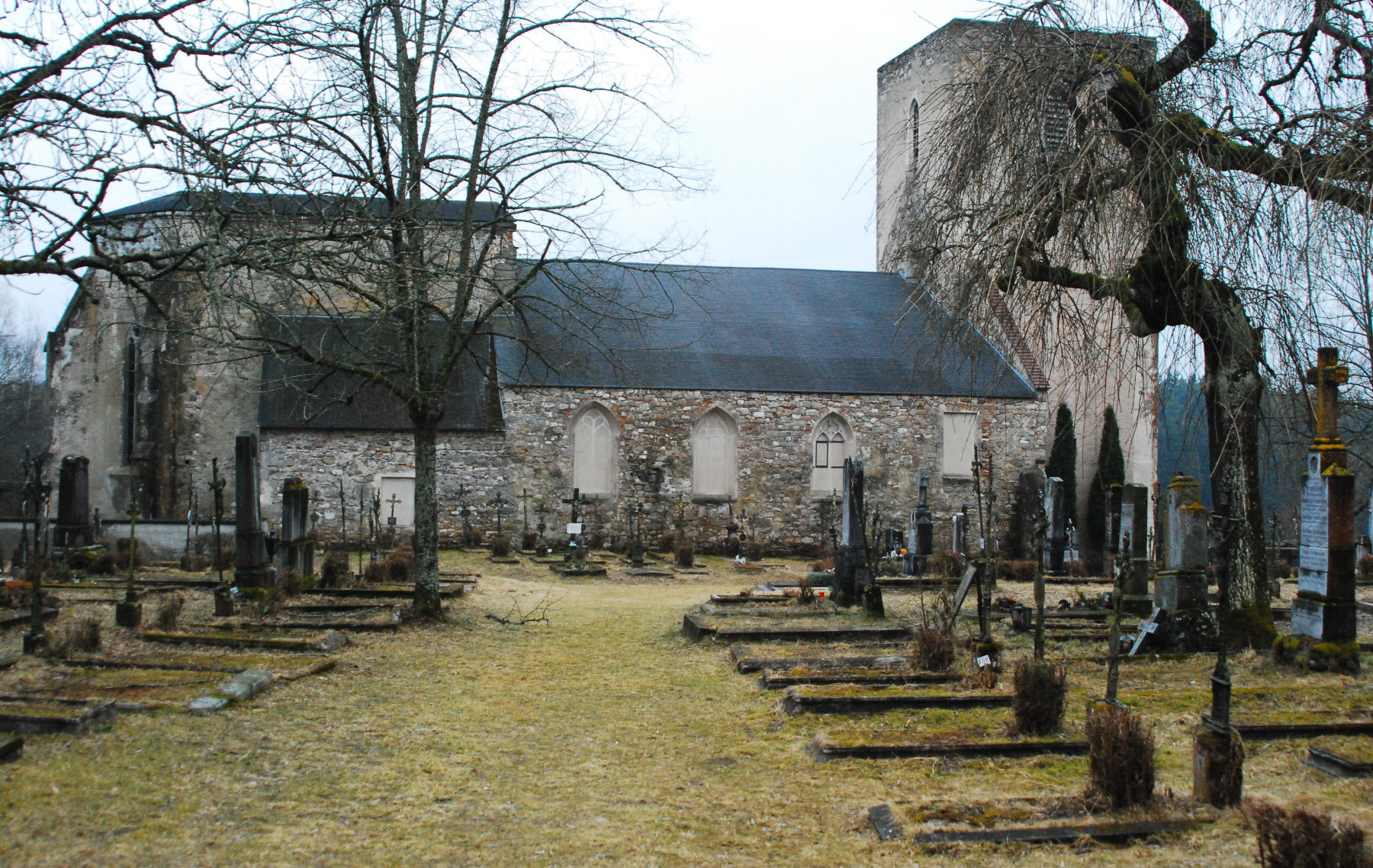
- Village church and cemetery

- Location within Austria
- Coordinates: 48°37′12.5″N 15°18′33.12″E
- Country: Austria
- State: Lower Austria
- District: Zwettl
- Municipality: Pölla
- Elevation: 475 m (1,558 ft)

Population (2022)
  - Total: 0
- Time zone: UTC+1 (CET)
  - Summer (DST): UTC+2 (CEST)
- Postal code: 3593
- Area code: (+43) 02988
- Licence plate: ZT
- Website: Official website

Döllersheim is an abandoned village in the Austrian state of Lower Austria, located in the rural Waldviertel region about 110 km (68 mi) northwest of Vienna. It was evacuated in 1938 to make way for a Wehrmacht training ground. Since 1 January 1964 it has been a Katastralgemeinde of the Pölla municipality in the Zwettl District.

== History ==
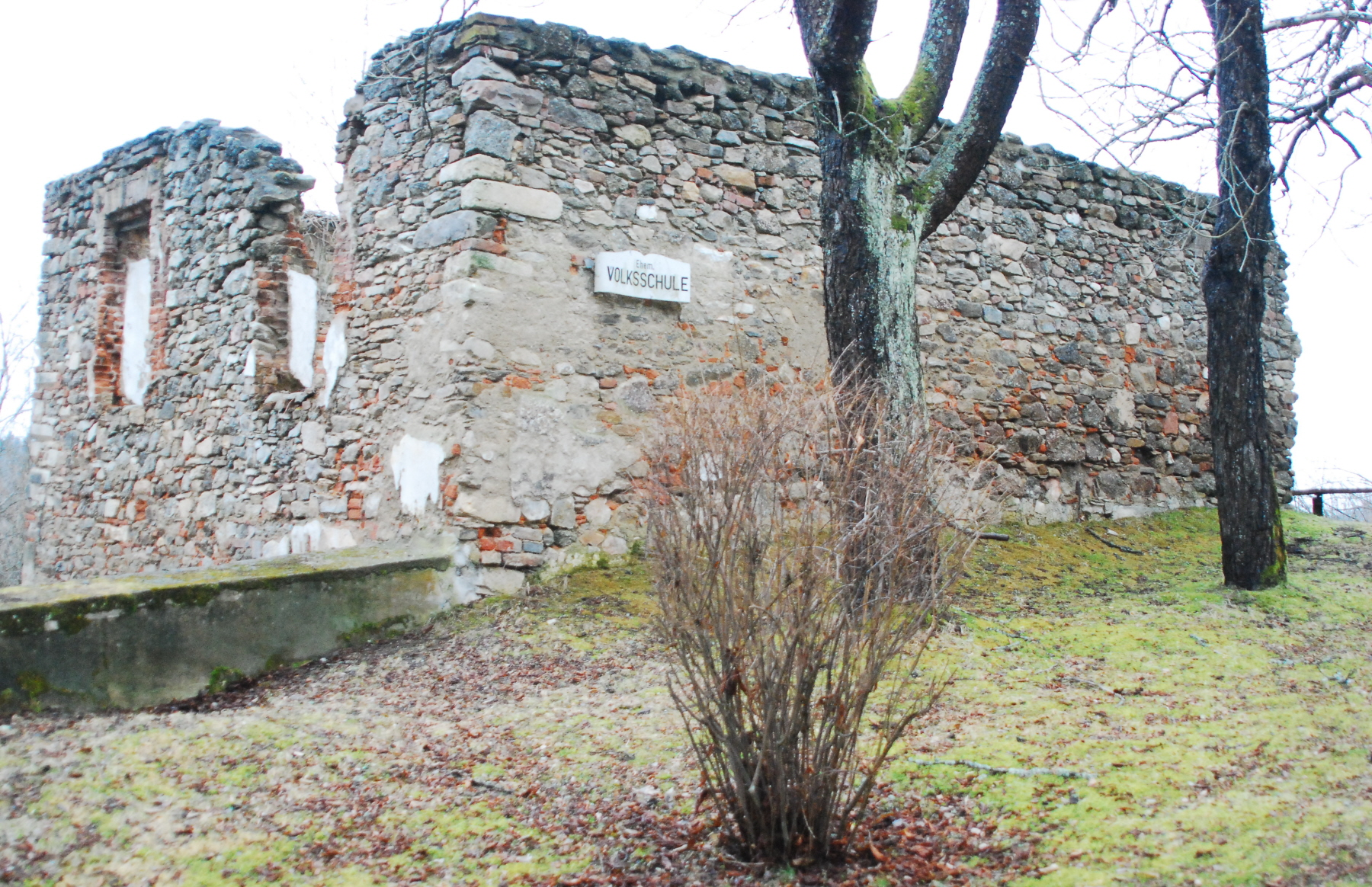
School house ruins

The village, situated in the March of Austria, was first mentioned in an 1143 deed issued by Duke Henry XI of Bavaria, whereby one Chunradus (Conrad) of Tolersheim appeared as a witness. Owing to its location near the Austrian border with Bohemia the nearby market town held by the Lords of Ottenstein was devastated during the Hussite Wars in 1427 and again in the run-up to the Battle of White Mountain in 1620.

The municipal area included the nearby hamlet of Strones, where in 1837 Alois Hitler, the father of Adolf Hitler, was born the illegitimate son of the local peasant woman Maria Schicklgruber (1795–1847). (Note: Adolf himself was born in Braunau am Inn, Upper Austria in 1889, the fourth child of the marriage of Alois and Klara Hitler, whose family was from Spital, (part of Weitra), not far from Döllersheim. See Kershaw, chapter 1. There is no evidence that any member of the Hitler family was born in Döllersheim, although it is possible that Maria and Alois's stepfather Johann Georg Hiedler may have been married there some five years after Alois's birth.) (Note: Although the majority of the inhabitants were Austrians, there was no sovereign country named "Austria" at the time; politically, the Archduchy of Austria since 1867 was subsumed within the Cisleithanian crown lands of the Austro-Hungarian empire ruled by the House of Habsburg.) Strones was very small at the time of Alois's birth and did not even have a church with a baptismal registry. (Note: Today there is no village called "Strones" in the area.) Accordingly, Maria went to the Döllersheim parish to record the birth with the local priest, who duly entered the information on the baptism registry. The same registry was altered some 39 years later when, in 1876, Alois legitimised Johann Georg Hiedler as his father and his surname was changed to Hitler.

After the 1938 Anschluss which annexed Austria to Nazi Germany, Hitler ordered that Döllersheim, Zwettl, Allentsteig, and several other smaller neighbouring villages be evacuated in favour of a large military training area, even though (or perhaps because) it contained the grave of his paternal grandmother, Maria. According to testimony given during the Nuremberg Trials by Hans Frank, head of the Nazi General Government in Poland, Hitler feared further clarification of the unconfirmed rumour that his paternal grandfather was a Graz Jew named Leopold Frankenberger. However, no evidence has ever supported this claim. The real reason for the area's selection may lie in its relatively sparse population, poor soils and consequently low agricultural yields, lack of industry, and not least, from a military training point of view, its very severe winter weather conditions.

The local authorities had bestowed honorary citizenship upon Hitler and re-constructed a grave of honour (Ehrengrab) for his grandmother, though to no avail. In the period up to 31 October 1941, Wehrmacht troops forcibly resettled all 2000 villagers before bombing their houses as part of the training exercises. In World War II the facility was home to the 392nd Infantry Division and the site of several prisoner-of-war camps including Stalag XVII-C and Oflag XVII-A (from June 1940) near the abandoned village of Edelbach.

Upon implementation of the 1945 German Instrument of Surrender and the Allied occupation of Austria, the training ground was seized by the Soviet Army and, despite raised claims for restitution, has remained a military exclusion zone (renamed Truppenübungsplatz Allentsteig) to this day, now operated by the Austrian Armed Forces. Since 1981, however, the main square, the ruins of the Romanesque parish church of Saints Peter and Paul, and its surrounding graveyard have been made accessible to visitors. In 1986, the church was reconsecrated as a "church of peace" by the Bishop of Sankt Pölten. The expelled inhabitants were not compensated until 1955.

== Bibliography ==
Reference works

- Kershaw, Ian (1999). Hitler 1889–1936: Hubris. New York: W. W. Norton & Company. ISBN 0-393-04671-0.
- Toland, John (1976). Adolf Hitler. New York: Doubleday & Company. ISBN 0-385-03724-4.
