= Klara Hitler =

Mother of Adolf Hitler (1860–1907)

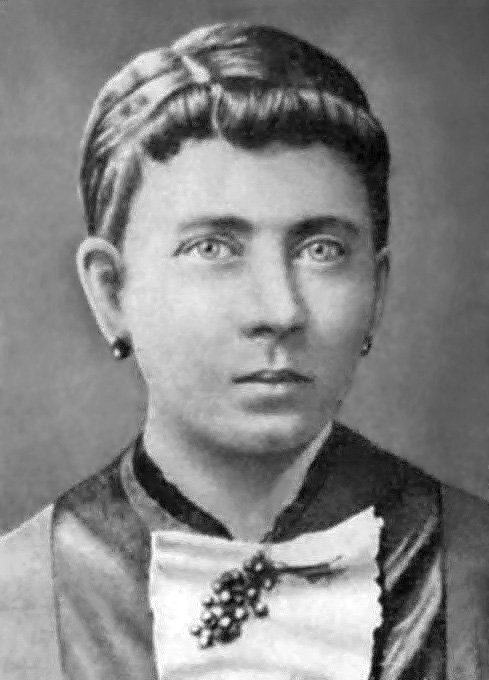
- Hitler c. 1875
- Born: Klara Pölzl; 12 August 1860; Weitra, Austria
- Died: 21 December 1907 (aged 47); Linz, Austria-Hungary
- Resting place: Town Cemetery, Leonding
- Known for: Mother of Adolf Hitler
- Spouse: Alois Hitler (m. 1885; died 1903)
- Children: 6, including Adolf and Paula
- Relatives: Hitler family (by marriage)

Klara Hitler (née Pölzl; 12 August 1860 – 21 December 1907) was the mother of Adolf Hitler, dictator of Nazi Germany from 1933 to 1945. In 1934, Adolf Hitler honoured his mother by naming a street in Passau after her.

== Early life and family ==
Klara was born in the Austrian village of Weitra to Johann Baptist Pölzl and Johanna Hiedler. In 1876, 16-year-old Klara was hired as a household servant by her relative Alois Hitler, three years after his first marriage to Anna Glasl-Hörer. Although Alois's biological father is unknown, after his mother, Maria Schicklgruber, married Johann Georg Hiedler, Alois was officially designated as Hiedler's son. Klara's mother was Hiedler's niece, making Klara and Alois first cousins once removed.

Alois's second wife, Franziska Matzelsberger, died in 1884. Klara and Alois married on 7 January 1885 in a brief ceremony held early in the morning at Hitler's rented rooms on the top floor of the Pommer Inn in Braunau am Inn. Alois then went to work for the day at his job as a customs official.

Their first son, Gustav, was born four months later, on 17 May 1885. Ida followed on 23 September 1886. Both infants died of diphtheria during the winter of 1887–88. A third child, Adolf, was born on 20 April 1889. A fourth child, Otto, was born and died in 1892.

In 1892, Klara and her family took the train to Passau, where they lived for the next two years. Edmund was born there on 24 March 1894. Paula followed on 21 January 1896. Edmund died of measles on 28 February 1900, at the age of five. Of Klara's six children, only Adolf and Paula survived to adulthood.

Klara's adult life was spent keeping house and raising children, in whom, according to Smith, Alois had little interest. She was very devoted to her children and, according to William Patrick Hitler, was a typical stepmother to her stepchildren, Alois, Jr. and Angela. She was a devout Roman Catholic and attended church regularly with her children.

== Later life and death ==
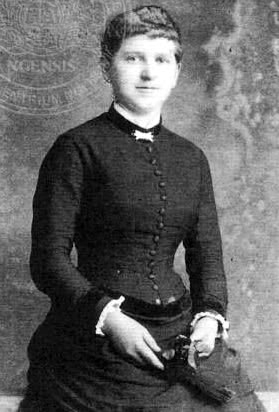
Klara Hitler, c. 1880s

When Alois died in 1903, he left a government pension. Klara sold the house in Leonding and moved with young Adolf and Paula to an apartment in Linz, where they lived frugally. In 1906, Klara discovered a lump in her breast but initially ignored it. After chest pain began keeping her awake at night, she consulted the family doctor, Eduard Bloch, in January 1907. She had been busy with her household, she said, so had neglected to seek medical aid. Bloch chose not to tell Klara that she had breast cancer and left it to Adolf to inform her. Bloch told Adolf that his mother had a small chance of surviving and recommended that she undergo a radical mastectomy.

The Hitlers were devastated by the news. According to Bloch, Klara "accepted the verdict as I was sure she would—with fortitude. Deeply religious, she assumed that her fate was God's will. It would never occur to her to complain." She underwent the mastectomy at Sisters of St. Mercy in Linz, whereupon the surgeon, Karl Urban, discovered that the cancer had already metastasized to the pleural tissue in her chest. Bloch told Klara's children that her condition was terminal. Adolf, who had been in Vienna ostensibly to study art, moved back home to tend to his mother, as did his siblings.

By October, Klara's condition had rapidly declined, and Adolf begged Bloch to try a new treatment. For the next 46 days (from November to early December), Bloch performed daily treatments of iodoform, a then experimental form of chemotherapy. Klara's mastectomy incisions were reopened, and massive doses of iodoform-soaked gauze were applied directly to the tissue to "burn" the cancer cells. The treatments were incredibly painful and caused Klara's throat to paralyze, leaving her unable to swallow. The treatments proved futile, and Klara Hitler died at home in Linz from the toxic side effects of iodoform on 21 December 1907. She was buried in Leonding, near Linz.

Adolf, who had a close relationship with his mother, was devastated by her death and carried the grief for the rest of his life. Bloch later recalled, "In all my career, I have never seen anyone so prostrate with grief as Adolf Hitler." In his autobiography Mein Kampf, Hitler wrote that he had "honored my father but loved my mother" and that his mother's death was a "dreadful blow". Decades later, in 1940, Hitler showed gratitude to Bloch, who was Jewish, for treating his mother by allowing him to emigrate with his wife from Austria to the United States, a privilege allowed to few other Jews in Austria.

In 1941 and 1943, the Office of Strategic Services (a predecessor of the Central Intelligence Agency) interviewed Bloch to gain information about Hitler's childhood. He said that Hitler's most striking feature was his love for his mother:

While Hitler was not a mother's boy in the usual sense, I never witnessed a closer attachment. Their love had been mutual. Klara Hitler adored her son. She allowed him his own way whenever possible. For example, she admired his watercolor paintings and drawings and supported his artistic ambitions in opposition to his father, at what cost to herself one may guess.

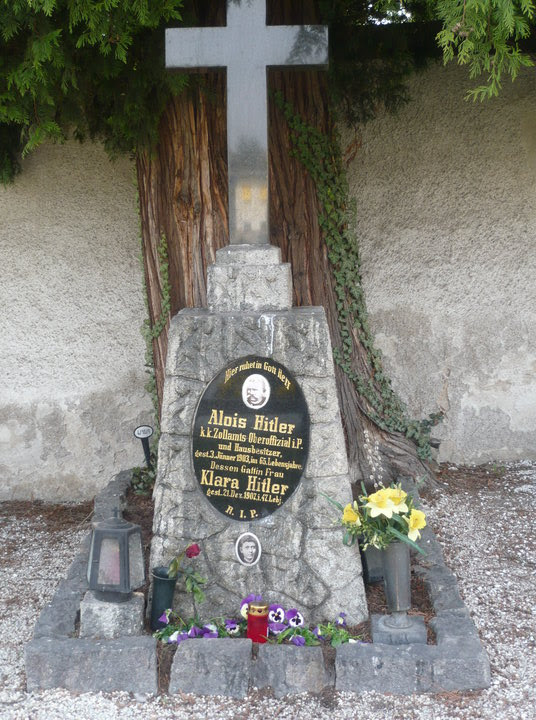
Alois and Klara's gravestone was removed in 2012.

Bloch expressly denied that Hitler's love for his mother was pathological. He remembered Hitler as the "saddest man I had ever seen" when he was informed about his mother's imminent death and viewed Klara as a "pious and kind" woman who "would turn in her grave if she knew what became of him".

== Removal of tombstone ==
On 28 March 2012, a descendant of Alois Hitler removed, without ceremony, the tombstone marking his and Klara's grave in Town Cemetery in Leonding in Austria, according to Kurt Pittertschatscher, the pastor of the parish. The descendant is said to be an elderly female relative of Alois's first wife, Anna, who has also given up any rights to the rented burial plot. It is not known what happened to the remains.

== See also ==
- Hitler family
