= Angela Hitler =

Half-sister of Adolf Hitler (1883–1949)

- Angela Hitler
- Born: Angela Franziska Johanna Hitler; 28 July 1883; Braunau am Inn, Austria-Hungary
- Died: 30 October 1949 (aged 66); Hanover, West Germany
- Other names: Angela Raubal; Angela Hammitzsch
- Spouses: Leo Raubal (m. 1903; died 1910) Martin Hammitzsch (m. 1936; died 1945)
- Children: 3, including Leo Jr. and Geli
- Father: Alois Hitler
- Relatives: Adolf Hitler (half-brother); Eva Braun (half-sister-in-law); Paula Hitler (half-sister); Alois Hitler Jr. (brother); William Patrick Hitler (nephew); Heinz Hitler (nephew); Bridget Dowling (sister-in-law)

Angela Franziska Johanna Hammitzsch (née Hitler; 28 July 1883 – 30 October 1949) was the elder half-sister of Adolf Hitler, dictator of Nazi Germany from 1933 to 1945. She was the mother of Geli Raubal by her first husband, Leo Raubal Sr.

== Life ==
Angela Hitler was born in Braunau am Inn, Austria-Hungary, the second child of Alois Hitler with his second wife, Franziska Matzelsberger. Her mother died the following year. She and her brother Alois Hitler Jr. were brought up by their father and his third wife Klara Pölzl. Her half-brother, Adolf Hitler, was born six years after her, and they grew very close. She is the only one of his siblings mentioned in Mein Kampf.

Angela's father died in 1903, and her stepmother died in 1907, leaving a small inheritance. On 14 September 1903, she married Leo Raubal (11 June 1879 – 10 August 1910), a junior tax inspector, and gave birth to a son, Leo on 12 October 1906. On 4 June 1908, Angela gave birth to Geli and in 1910 to a second daughter, Elfriede (Elfriede Maria Hochegger, 10 January 1910 – 24 September 1993). Her husband died of tuberculosis in 1910.

=== Widow ===
She moved to Vienna following World War I. Walter Langer's wartime report The Mind of Adolf Hitler, an OSS profile of the Hitler family, paints a positive picture of Angela at this period, describing her as "rather a decent and industrious person". It says she became manager of Mensa Academia Judaica, a boarding house for Jewish students, where she once defended those in her care against antisemitic rioters. According to Langer:

Some of our informants knew her during this time and report that in the student riots Angela defended the Jewish students from attack and on several occasions beat the Aryan students away from the steps of the dining hall with a club. She is a rather large, strong peasant type of person who is well able to take an active part.

Angela had heard nothing from Adolf for a decade when he re-established contact with her in 1919. In 1924, Adolf was confined in Landsberg; Angela made the trip from Vienna to visit him. In 1928, she and Geli moved to the Haus Wachenfeld at Obersalzberg near Berchtesgaden, where she became his housekeeper and later was put in charge of the household at Hitler's expanded retreat. Geli died by suicide in 1931.

Angela continued to work for her half-brother following Geli's death, but she strongly disapproved of Adolf's relationship with Eva Braun. She eventually left Berchtesgaden as a result and moved to Dresden.

=== Remarriage ===
On 18 February 1936, Angela married architect Professor Martin Hammitzsch (22 May 1878 – 12 May 1945), who designed the Yenidze cigarette factory in Dresden and who later became the director of the State School of Building Construction in that city.

On 26 June 1936, the couple returned to Passau. When they visited the house at the Inn river where Angela had lived as a child, they left an entry in the visitors' book, which the local newspaper reported.

Adolf Hitler apparently disapproved of the marriage, and referred to his half-sister as Frau Hammitzsch. Adolf must have re-established contact with her during World War II because Angela remained his intermediary to the rest of the family, with whom he did not want any contact. In 1941, she sold her memoirs of her years with Adolf to the Eher-Verlag, which brought her 20,000 ℛ︁ℳ︁.

In Spring 1945, after the destruction of Dresden in the February massive air raid, Adolf moved Angela to Berchtesgaden to avoid her being captured by the Soviets. He also lent her and his younger sister Paula over 100,000 ℛ︁ℳ︁, equivalent to €394,700 in 2021. In Hitler's will, he guaranteed Angela a pension of 1,000 ℛ︁ℳ︁ monthly from his personal wealth bequeathed to the German state. It is uncertain if she ever received any payments because Adolf's Swiss bank accounts were frozen until the 1990s, and much of the money was seized by the US government. Her second husband died by suicide shortly after the defeat of Germany.

=== Post-war ===
Adolf apparently had a low opinion of the intelligence of both his sisters, calling them "stupid geese". Nevertheless, she spoke very highly of him, even after the war, and claimed that neither her half brother nor she had known anything about the Holocaust. Angela Hitler died of a stroke on 30 October 1949 in Hanover.

== Family ==
Angela's son, Leo, had a son – Peter (b. 1931). Her daughter Elfriede married German lawyer Ernst Hochegger on 27 June 1937 in Düsseldorf; they had a son, Heiner Hochegger (born January 1945).

== In popular culture ==
Angela Hitler is played by Helene Thimig in the 1944 film The Hitler Gang. In the miniseries Hitler: The Rise of Evil (2003), she is portrayed by Julie-Ann Hassett.

In the French comedy L'as des as (1982), Angela Hitler is portrayed as the caretaker of Hitler's Obersalzberg residence. She is played in drag by Günter Meisner, the same actor who plays Hitler.

== See also ==
- Hitler family

== Sources ==
- (in Dutch) "De jeugd van Adolf Hitler 1889–1907 en zijn familie en voorouders" by Marc Vermeeren. Soesterberg, 2007, 420 blz. Uitgeverij Aspekt, ISBN 90-5911-606-2
