= Paula Hitler =

Younger sister of Adolf Hitler (1896–1960)

- Hitler in 1945
- Born: 21 January 1896; Hafeld, Fischlham, Austria-Hungary
- Died: 1 June 1960 (aged 64); Schönau am Königssee, West Germany
- Resting place: Bergfriedhof in Berchtesgaden/Schönau
- Other names: Paula Wolff; Paula Hitler-Wolff
- Known for: Sister of German dictator Adolf Hitler
- Parents: Alois Hitler; Klara Hitler
- Relatives: Adolf Hitler (brother); Angela Hitler (half-sister); Gustav Hitler (brother); Otto Hitler (brother); Ida Hitler (sister); Edmund Hitler (brother); Alois Hitler Jr. (half-brother)

Paula Hitler, also known as Paula Wolff and Paula Hitler-Wolff (21 January 1896 – 1 June 1960), was the younger sister of Adolf Hitler and the last child of Alois Hitler and his third wife, Klara Pölzl.

== Early life ==
Paula Hitler was born in Hafeld, Fischlham, Upper Austria, on 21 January 1896 to Alois Hitler and Klara Hitler (née Pölzl). She was Adolf Hitler's only full-sister and only full-sibling who survived to adulthood. She was six years old when her father, a retired customs official, died, and eleven when her mother died, after which the Austrian government provided a small pension to her and Adolf. The amount was relatively meager and Adolf eventually agreed to sign his share over to her.

== Adult life ==
Paula later moved to Vienna. In the early 1920s, she was hired as a housekeeper at a dormitory for Jewish university students. In 1921, while she worked at the dormitory, she was visited by her brother who she said appeared as if he had "fallen from heaven". For the most part, she had no other contact with her brother during his struggling years as a painter in Vienna and later in Munich, his military service during World War I and his early political activities. She was delighted to meet him again in Vienna during the early 1930s.

Paula used the surname "Hiedler", the original spelling of "Hitler". By her own account, after losing a job with the Austrian State Insurance Company on 2 August 1930 when her employers found out who she was, Paula received financial support of 250 schillings a month from her brother, and lived under the assumed surname of "Wolff" at Adolf Hitler's request. "Wolf" was a childhood nickname of his which he had also used during the 1920s for security purposes.

Adolf Hitler appears to have had a low opinion of Paula's intelligence, referring to both her and their half-sister Angela as "dumme Gans" ("stupid goose").

Paula later claimed to have seen her brother about once a year during the 1930s and early 1940s. She worked as a secretary in a military field hospital for much of World War II.

On 14 April 1945, during the closing days of the war and at the age of 49, she was driven by two SS men to Berchtesgaden, Germany – the location of Hitler's summer home, the Berghof – apparently on the orders of Martin Bormann. She and her half-sister, Angela, were each given 100,000 Reichsmarks on Adolf Hitler's orders. There is some evidence that Paula shared her brother's strong German nationalist beliefs, but she was not politically active and never joined the Nazi Party.

== Post-war life ==
Paula was arrested by US counter-intelligence officers on 26 May 1945 and interviewed on 12 July.

She characterized her childhood relationship with her brother as one of both constant bickering and strong affection. Paula said that she could not bring herself to believe that her brother had been responsible for the Holocaust. She had also told them that she had met Eva Braun only once. After her debriefing, Paula was released from American custody and returned to Vienna, where she lived on her savings for a time, then worked in an arts and crafts shop.

She returned to Berchtesgaden on 1 December 1952 and took up full-time residence there under the name "Paula Wolff" or "Paula Hitler-Wolff", in connection with a claim she had filed under Adolf's will, which had been denied by a court. During this time, she was looked after by former members of the SS and survivors of her brother's inner circle.

In February 1959, she agreed to be interviewed by Peter Morley, a British documentary producer for Associated-Rediffusion, an ITV channel. The conversation was the only filmed interview she ever gave and was broadcast as part of a programme called Tyranny: The Years of Adolf Hitler. She talked mostly about their childhood and refused to answer any political questions. Footage from this and a contemporary interview with Morley was included in the 2005 television documentary The Hitler Family (original German title Familie Hitler: Im Schatten des Diktators), directed by Oliver Halmburger and Thomas Staehler.

== Death and burial ==
Paula died on 1 June 1960 in Schönau am Königssee near Berchtesgaden, at the age of 64, the last surviving member of Hitler's immediate family. She was buried in the Bergfriedhof in Berchtesgaden/Schönau under the name Paula Hitler. In June 2005, the wooden grave marker and remains were reportedly removed when another burial took place at the same spot, a common practice in German cemeteries after two or more decades have elapsed. In May 2006, however, the grave marker was returned to Paula's grave with a hinged panel, covering her name, that displays the names of the more recent burials.

Five months after her death, the Federal Court in Berchtesgaden issued a certificate of inheritance in which Paula Hitler was awarded two-thirds of Adolf's estate.

== See also ==
- Hitler family
