= Maria Schicklgruber =

Adolf Hitler's paternal grandmother (1795–1847)

- Born: Maria Anna Schicklgruber; 15 April 1795; Strones, Austria
- Died: 6 January 1847 (aged 51); Klein-Motten, Austria
- Known for: Paternal grandmother of Adolf Hitler
- Spouse: Johann Georg Hiedler (m. 1842)
- Children: Alois Hitler
- Relatives: Hitler family

Maria Anna Schicklgruber (15 April 1795 – 6 January 1847) was the mother of Alois Hitler, and the paternal grandmother of Adolf Hitler.

== Family ==
Maria was born in the village of Strones in the Waldviertel region of the Archduchy of Austria. She was the daughter of farmer Johannes Schicklgruber (29 May 1764 – 12 November 1847) and Theresia Pfeisinger (7 September 1769 – 11 November 1821). Maria was a Catholic; what is known about her is based on church and other public records.

Maria was one of eleven children, of whom only six survived infancy. Her early life was that of a poor peasant child in a rural and largely forested area in the northwest part of Lower Austria, northwest of Vienna.

In 1821, Maria's mother died when Maria was 26 years old. She received an inheritance of 74.25 gulden, which she left invested in the Orphans' Fund until 1838. By that time it had more than doubled to 165 gulden. At that time, a breeding pig cost 4 gulden, a cow 10–12 gulden, and an entire inn perhaps 500 gulden. Werner Maser wrote she was a "thrifty, reserved, and exceptionally shrewd peasant woman."

== The birth of Alois ==
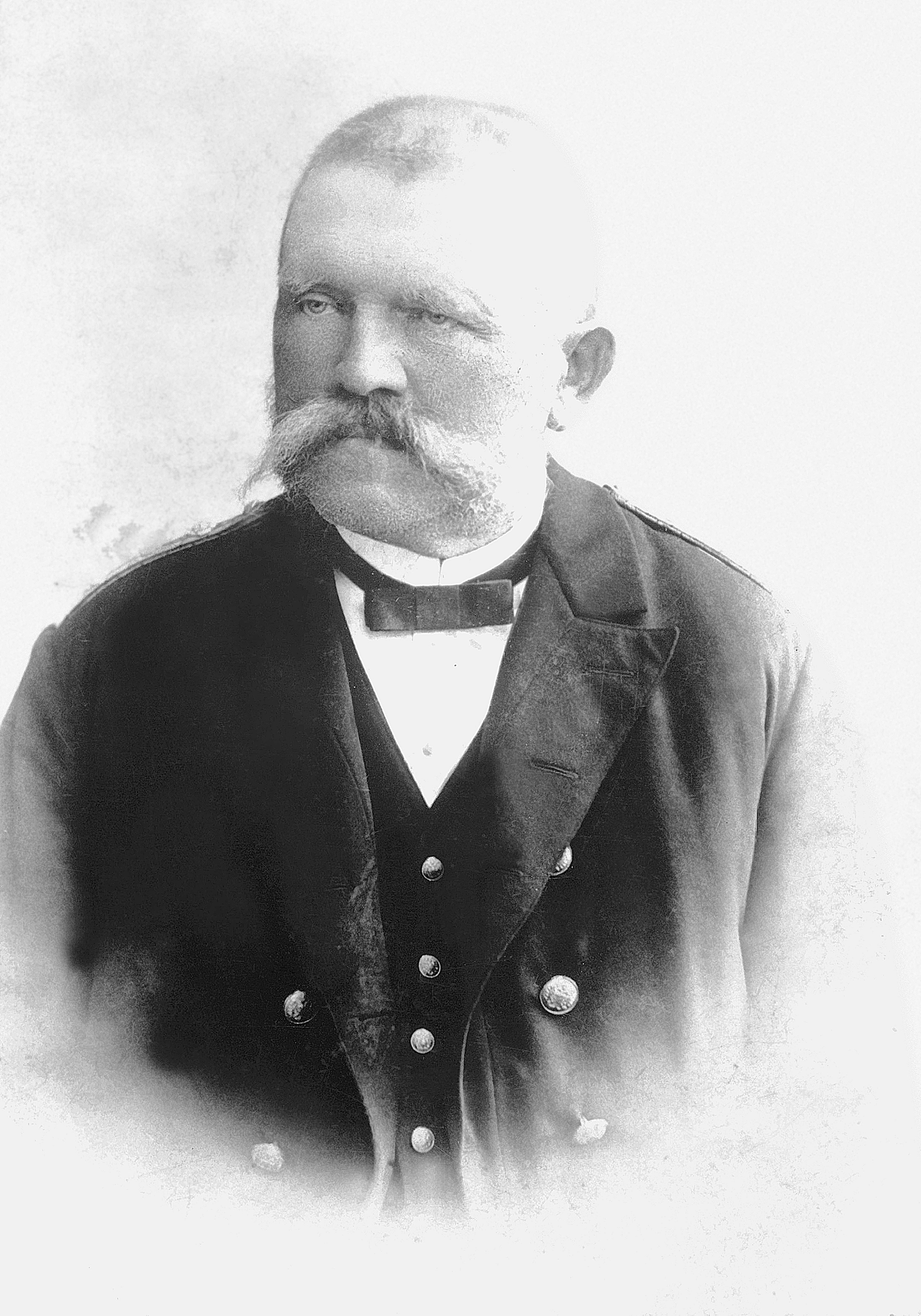
Schicklgruber's son Alois in his later years

In 1837, when she was 42 years old and still unmarried, her only child, Alois, was born. Maser notes that she refused to reveal who the boy's father was, so the priest baptized the baby Alois Schicklgruber and entered "illegitimate" in place of the father's name on the baptismal register. Historians have discussed various candidates for the father of Alois:

- Johann Georg Hiedler, who later married Maria, whose name was added to the birth certificate later in Alois's life, and who was accepted officially by Nazi Germany as Alois's father (i.e., as the paternal grandfather of Adolf Hitler).
- Johann Nepomuk Hiedler, Johann Georg's brother and Alois's step-uncle, who raised Alois through adolescence and later willed him a considerable portion of his life savings, but who, if he were the real father of Alois, never found it expedient to admit it publicly.
- An alleged Jewish man named Leopold Frankenberger, as reported by ex-Nazi Hans Frank during the Nuremberg trials. Prominent historians dismiss the Frankenberger hypothesis (which had only Frank's speculation as evidence) as baseless, as there were no Jewish families in Graz at the time Maria became pregnant.

At the time of the birth of Alois, Maria was living with a Strones village family by the name of Trummelschlager. Mr and Mrs Trummelschlager were listed as Alois's godparents.

Maria soon began residence with her father at house number 22 in Strones. After an unknown period, the three Schicklgrubers were joined by Johann Georg Hiedler, an itinerant journeyman miller. On 10 May 1842, five years after Alois was born, Maria Anna Schicklgruber married Johann Georg Hiedler in the nearby village of Döllersheim. Maria was 47 years old, and her new husband was 50.

Whether or not Johann Georg Hiedler was actually the biological paternal grandfather of Hitler may remain unknown, as he was not recorded originally as the father on Alois's birth certificate. Illegitimacy was common in lower Austria; in some areas, it reached as many as forty percent of births, and as late as 1903 the rate was twenty-four percent, with the children normally legitimized at a later date. Hitler's ancestry was questioned when his opponents began spreading rumours that his paternal grandfather was Jewish, since one of Nazism's major principles was that to be considered a pure "Aryan" one had to have a documented ancestry certificate (Ahnenpass).

In 1931, Hitler ordered the Schutzstaffel (SS) to investigate the alleged rumours regarding his ancestry; they found no evidence of any Jewish ancestors. He then ordered a genealogist by the name of Rudolf Koppensteiner to publish a large illustrated genealogical tree showing his ancestry. This was published in the book Die Ahnentafel des Führers ("The pedigree of the Leader") in 1937, which concluded that Hitler's family were all Austrian Germans with no Jewish ancestry and that Hitler had an unblemished "Aryan" pedigree. As Alois himself legitimized Johann Georg Hiedler as his biological father (with three witnesses affirming and watching this) and the priest changed the father's blank space on the birth certificate in 1876, this was considered certified proof for Hitler's ancestry, and thus Hitler was considered an "Aryan".

== Death and gravesite ==
Maria died during the sixth year of her marriage, at the age of 51 in Klein-Motten, where she was living with her husband in the home of kin, the Sillip family. She died of "consumption resulting from pectoral (thoracic) dropsy" in 1847. She was buried in the parish church cemetery in Döllersheim.

After the Anschluss of Austria in 1938, a search failed to find her grave, so she was given an "honour grave" next to the church wall. This grave was tended by local Hitler Youth groups whilst Döllersheim and the surrounding areas were made proving ground areas. In 1942, this area became part of an artillery training area, and the local inhabitants were moved out. Military training continued during the Soviet occupation after the war and also by the Austrian Army until about 1985, by which time most of the towns and villages were in ruins. The church at Döllersheim is now preserved and undergoing reconstruction. The cemetery is being tended, but there is no grave marker remaining for Maria Schicklgruber.

== See also ==
- Hitler family
