= Adolf Hitler =

Dictator of Germany from 1933 to 1945

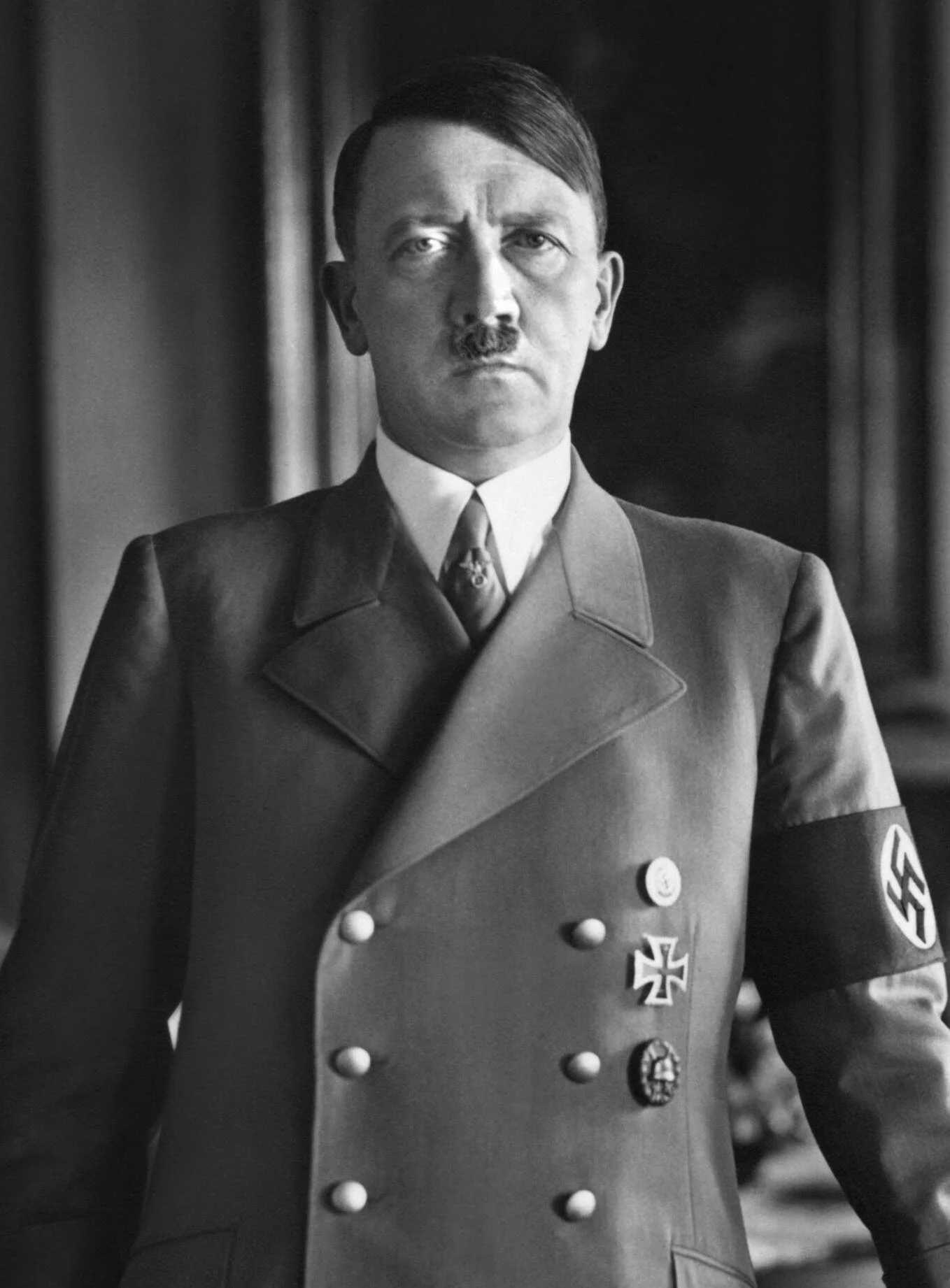
- Formal portrait, 1938

Führer of Germany
- In office 2 August 1934 – 30 April 1945
- Preceded by: Paul von Hindenburg (as Reichspräsident)
- Succeeded by: Karl Dönitz (as Reichspräsident)

Chancellor of Germany
- In office 30 January 1933 – 30 April 1945
- President: Paul von Hindenburg (1933–1934)
- Vice-Chancellor: Franz von Papen (1933–1934)
- Preceded by: Kurt von Schleicher
- Succeeded by: Joseph Goebbels

Führer of the Nazi Party
- In office 29 July 1921 – 30 April 1945
- Deputy: Rudolf Hess (1933–1941)
- Preceded by: Anton Drexler (Party Chairman)
- Succeeded by: Martin Bormann (Party Minister)

Member of the Reichstag for Upper Bavaria–Swabia
- In office 21 March 1933 – 30 April 1945
- Preceded by: Multi-member district
- Succeeded by: Constituency abolished

Personal details
- Born: 20 April 1889 Braunau am Inn, Austria-Hungary
- Died: 30 April 1945 (aged 56) Berlin, Germany
- Cause of death: Self-inflicted gunshot wound
- Citizenship: Austria (until 1925); Stateless (1925–1932); Germany (from 1932)
- Party: Nazi Party (from 1920)
- Other political affiliations: German Workers' Party (1919–1920)
- Spouse: Eva Braun (m. 1945; died 1945)
- Parents: Alois Hitler; Klara Pölzl
- Relatives: Hitler family
- Cabinet: Hitler cabinet

Military service
- Allegiance: German Empire; Weimar Republic; Nazi Germany
- Branch: Imperial German Army; Bavarian Army; Reichswehr
- Years of service: 1914–1920
- Rank: Gefreiter
- Commands: German Army (from 1941); Army Group A (1942)
- Wars: World War I; Western Front; First Battle of Ypres; Battle of the Somme (WIA); Battle of Arras; Battle of Passchendaele; World War II ‡‡
- Awards: List of awards
- Hitler's voice Hitler on the 12th anniversary of the Nazi regime Recorded 30 January 1945

Adolf Hitler (Note: German: [ˈaːdɔlf ˈhɪtlɐ]) (20 April 1889 – 30 April 1945) was an Austrian-born German politician who was dictator of Germany in the Nazi era from 1933 until his suicide in 1945. He rose to power as the leader of the Nazi Party, (Note: Officially the National Socialist German Workers' Party (German: Nationalsozialistische Deutsche Arbeiterpartei, pronounced [natsi̯oˈnaːlzotsi̯aˌlɪstɪʃə ˈdɔʏtʃə ˈʔaʁbaɪtɐpaʁˌtaɪ]; or NSDAP)) becoming the chancellor of Germany in 1933 and then taking the title of Führer und Reichskanzler in 1934. (Note: The position of Führer und Reichskanzler ('leader and chancellor', lit. 'leader and chancellor of the empire ' or 'leader and chancellor of the realm') replaced the position of Reichspräsident ('president', lit. 'president of the empire ' or 'president of the realm'), who was the head of state for the Weimar Republic. Hitler assumed this title after the death of Paul von Hindenburg, who had served as Reichspräsident. He was afterwards both head of state and head of government, with the full official title of Führer und Reichskanzler des Deutschen Reiches und Volkes ('leader and chancellor of the German empire and people').) Germany's invasion of Poland on 1 September 1939 under his leadership marked the outbreak of the Second World War. Throughout the ensuing conflict, Hitler was closely involved in the direction of German military operations and was central to the perpetration of the genocide of about six million Jews in the Holocaust as well as the deaths of millions of other victims.

Hitler was born in Braunau am Inn in Austria-Hungary and moved to Germany in 1913. He was decorated during his service in the German Army in the First World War, receiving the Iron Cross. In 1919, he joined the German Workers' Party (DAP), the precursor of the Nazi Party, and in 1921, was appointed the leader of the Nazi Party. In 1923, he attempted to seize governmental power in a failed coup in Munich and was sentenced to five years in prison, serving just over a year. While there, he dictated the first volume of his autobiography and political manifesto Mein Kampf ('my struggle'). After his early release in 1924, he gained popular support by attacking the Treaty of Versailles as well as promoting pan-Germanism, antisemitism, and anti-communism with charismatic oratory and Nazi propaganda. He frequently denounced communism as being part of an international Jewish conspiracy.

Following elections to the Reichstag in November 1932, the Nazi Party held the most seats in the Reichstag ('parliament'), but not a majority. Subsequently, former chancellor Franz von Papen and other conservative politicians convinced Reichspräsident ('president') Paul von Hindenburg to appoint Hitler as chancellor on 30 January 1933. Shortly thereafter, on 23 March, the Reichstag passed the Enabling Act of 1933, which ultimately began the Weimar Republic's transformation into Nazi Germany. Upon Hindenburg's death on 2 August 1934, Hitler replaced him as head of state and thereafter, Germany became a totalitarian dictatorship. Domestically, Hitler began to implement numerous racist policies, which marginalised and scapegoated German Jews. His first six years in power resulted in rapid economic recovery from the Great Depression, the abrogation of restrictions imposed on Germany after the First World War, and the annexation of territories inhabited by millions of ethnic Germans, which won him significant popularity.

One of Hitler's key goals was Lebensraum ('living space') for the German people in Eastern Europe. His aggressive, expansionist foreign policy is considered the primary cause of World War II in Europe. On 1 September 1939, Hitler oversaw the German invasion of Poland, thereby causing Britain and France to declare war on Germany. After ordering an invasion of the Soviet Union in June 1941, he declared war on the United States in December of the same year. By the end of 1941, German forces and the European Axis powers occupied most of Europe and North Africa. These gains were gradually reversed after 1941 until the Allied forces defeated the German military in 1945. On 29 April 1945, Hitler married his longtime partner, Eva Braun, in the Führerbunker ('leader's bunker') in Berlin. They committed suicide the next day to avoid capture by the Soviet Red Army.

The historian and biographer Ian Kershaw described Hitler as "the embodiment of modern political evil". Under Hitler's leadership and racist ideology, the Nazi regime was responsible for the genocide of an estimated six million Jews and millions of other victims, whom he and his followers deemed Untermenschen ('subhumans') or socially undesirable. Hitler and the Nazis were also responsible for the deliberate killing of an estimated 19.3 million civilians and prisoners of war. In addition, 28.7 million soldiers and civilians died as a result of military action in the European theatre. In absolute terms, the number of civilians killed during World War II was unprecedented in warfare, and the casualties make it the deadliest conflict in history.

== Ancestry ==
Hitler's father, Alois Hitler, was the illegitimate child of Maria Schicklgruber. The baptismal register did not show the name of his father, and Alois initially bore his mother's surname, Schicklgruber. In 1842, Johann Georg Hiedler married Alois's mother. Alois was brought up in the family of Hiedler's brother, Johann Nepomuk Hiedler. Alois worked as a civil servant from 1855 until his retirement in 1895. In 1876, Alois was made legitimate and his baptismal record annotated by a priest to register Johann Georg Hiedler as Alois's father (recorded as Georg Hitler). Alois then assumed the surname Hitler, also spelled Hiedler, Hüttler, and Huettler. The name is probably based on the German word Hütte (lit. 'hut'), and has the meaning 'one who lives in a hut'.

The Nazi official Hans Frank suggested that Alois's mother had been employed as a housekeeper by a Jewish family in Graz, and that the family's 19-year-old son Leopold Frankenberger had fathered Alois, a claim that came to be known as the Frankenberger thesis. Nobody named Frankenberger was registered in Graz during that period, and no record has been produced of a Leopold Frankenberger's existence, so historians dismiss the claim that Alois's father was Jewish. In 2025, blood from the sofa in Hitler's study was used by Turi King of the University of Bath for DNA analysis. The blood was confirmed to be Hitler's by comparing it to that of a male-line relative, and the DNA analysis also showed that Hitler did not have Jewish ancestry through his father. "If that was the case, we wouldn't have got the DNA match with him," King said. "That DNA match not only confirmed that this is Hitler's DNA but also confirms that the story of human Jewish ancestry through his father is just simply not true."

== Early life ==
=== Childhood and education ===
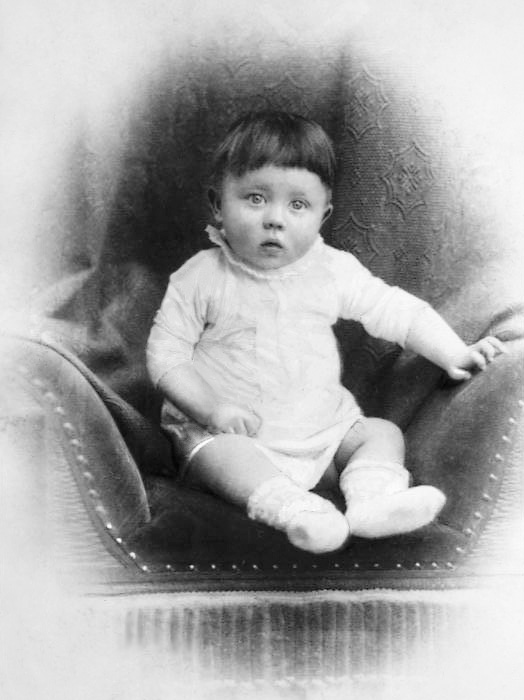
Hitler, c. 1889–1890

Adolf Hitler was born on 20 April 1889 in Braunau am Inn, a town in Austria-Hungary (present-day Austria), close to the border with Germany. He was the fourth of six children born to Alois Hitler and his third wife, Klara Pölzl. Three of Hitler's siblings (Gustav, Ida, and Otto) died in infancy. Also living in the household were Alois's children from his second marriage: Alois Jr. (born 1882) and Angela (born 1883). In 1892, the family moved to Passau, Germany, following Alois's promotion to the customs administration in Passau. Hitler was three at the time. Alois was promoted and transferred to Linz, Austria, on 1 April 1893, but the rest of the family remained in Passau. The family returned to Austria and settled in Leonding on 9 May 1894, and in June 1895, Alois retired to Hafeld, near Lambach, where he farmed and kept bees. Hitler attended Volksschule (a state-funded primary school) in nearby Fischlham.

The move to Hafeld coincided with the onset of intense father–son conflicts caused by six-year-old Hitler's refusal to conform to the strict discipline of his school. Alois tried to browbeat his son into obedience, while Adolf did his best to be the opposite of whatever his father wanted. Alois would also beat his son, although his mother tried to protect him from regular beatings.

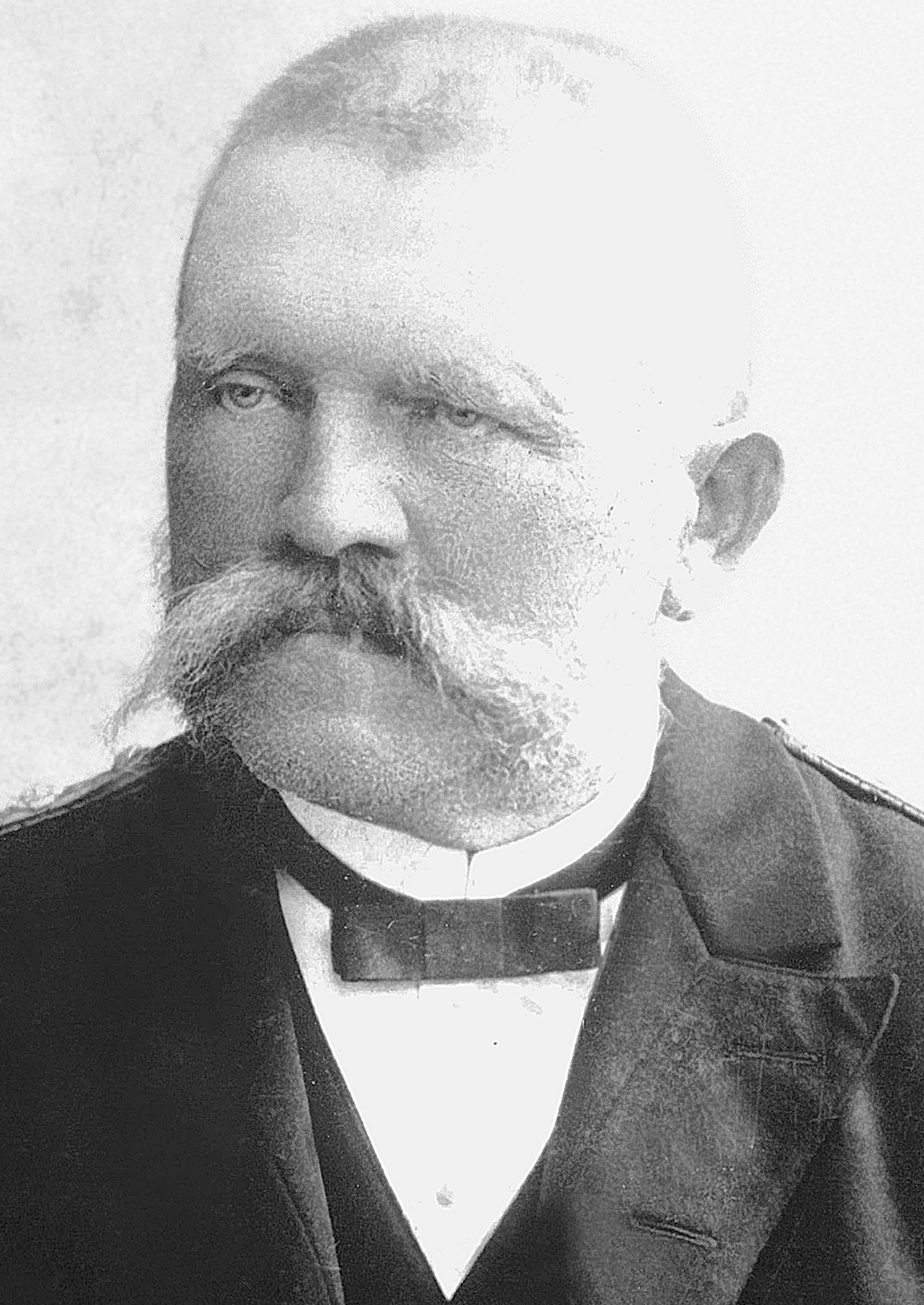
Hitler's father, Alois, c. 1900

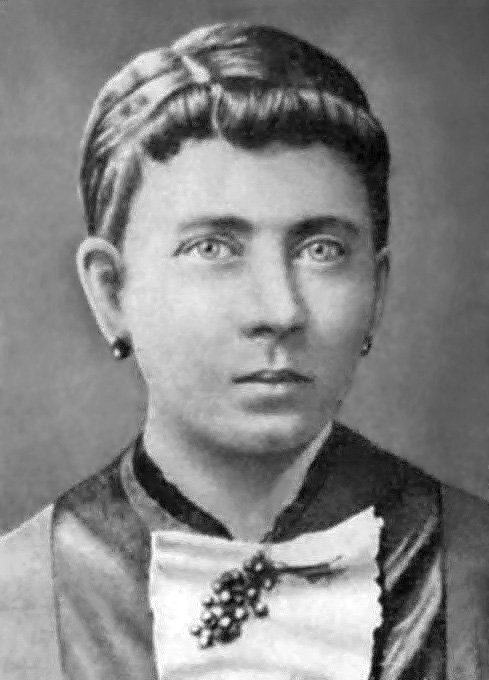
Hitler's mother, Klara, 1870s

Alois Hitler's farming efforts at Hafeld were unsuccessful, and in 1897, the family moved to Lambach. The eight-year-old Hitler took singing lessons, sang in the church choir, and even considered becoming a priest. In 1898, the family returned permanently to Leonding. Hitler was deeply affected by the death of his younger brother Edmund in 1900 from measles. Hitler transformed from a confident, outgoing, and conscientious student to a morose, detached boy who frequently clashed with his father and teachers. Paula Hitler recalled that Adolf was a teenage bully who would often slap her.

Alois had made a successful career in the customs bureau and wanted his son to follow in his footsteps. Hitler later dramatised an episode from this period when his father took him to visit a customs office, depicting it as an event that gave rise to an unforgiving antagonism between father and son, who were both strong-willed. Ignoring his son's desire to attend a classical high school and become an artist, Alois sent Hitler to the Realschule in Linz in September 1900. (Note: The successor institution to the Realschule in Linz is Bundesrealgymnasium Linz Fadingerstraße.) Hitler rebelled against this decision, and in Mein Kampf states that he intentionally performed poorly in school, hoping that once his father saw "what little progress I was making at the technical school he would let me devote myself to my dream".

Like many Austrian Germans, Hitler began to develop German nationalist ideas from a young age. He expressed loyalty only to Germany, despising the declining Habsburg monarchy and its rule over an ethnically diverse empire. Hitler and his friends used the greeting Heil, and sang the "Deutschlandlied" instead of the Austrian Imperial anthem. After Alois's sudden death on 3 January 1903, Hitler's performance at school deteriorated, and his mother allowed him to leave. He enrolled at the Realschule in Steyr in September 1904, where his behaviour and performance improved. In 1905, after passing a repeat of the final exam, Hitler left the school without any ambitions for further education or clear plans for a career.

=== Early adulthood in Vienna and Munich ===
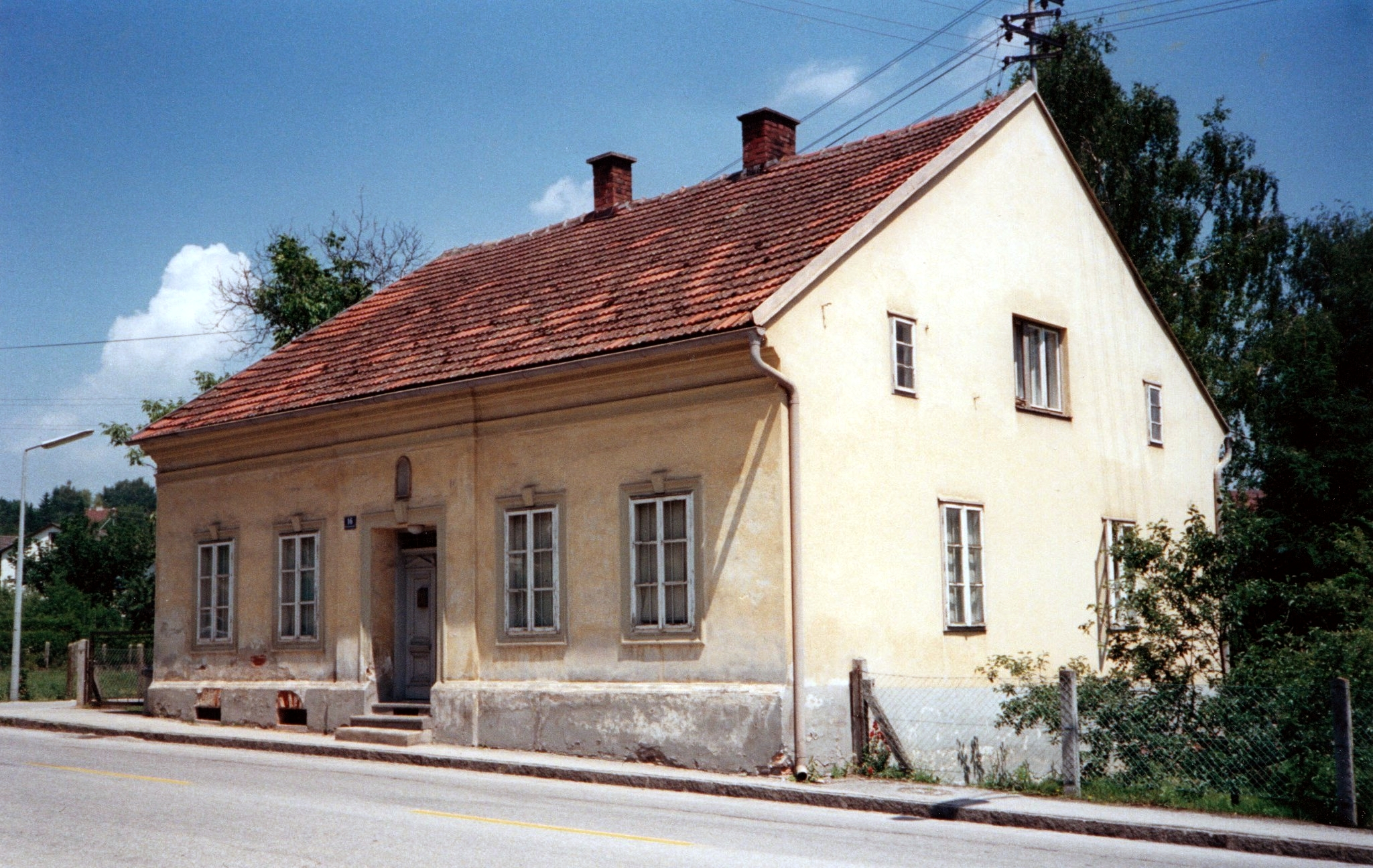
The house in Leonding, Austria, where Hitler spent his early adolescence

In 1907, Hitler left Linz to live and study fine art in Vienna, financed by an orphan's benefits and support from his mother. He applied for admission to the Academy of Fine Arts Vienna but was rejected twice. The director suggested Hitler should apply to the School of Architecture, but he lacked the necessary academic credentials because he had not finished secondary school.

On 21 December 1907, his mother died of breast cancer at the age of 47; Hitler was 18 at the time. In 1909, Hitler ran out of money and was forced to live a bohemian life in homeless shelters and the Meldemannstraße dormitory. He earned money as a casual labourer and by painting and selling watercolours of Vienna's sights. During his time in Vienna, he pursued a growing passion for architecture and music, attending ten performances of Lohengrin, his favourite of Richard Wagner's operas.

In Vienna, Hitler was first exposed to racist rhetoric. Populists such as mayor Karl Lueger exploited the city's prevalent antisemitic sentiment, occasionally also espousing German nationalist notions for political benefit. German nationalism was especially widespread in the Mariahilf district, where Hitler then lived. Georg Ritter von Schönerer became a major influence on Hitler, and he developed an admiration for Martin Luther.

Hitler read newspapers and pamphlets that promoted prejudice and warned of an influx of Eastern European Jews, as well as writings by figures such as Houston Stewart Chamberlain, Charles Darwin, Friedrich Nietzsche, Gustave Le Bon, and Arthur Schopenhauer. During his years in Vienna he also developed strong anti-Slavic sentiments.

The origin and development of Hitler's antisemitism remain a matter of debate. His friend August Kubizek claimed that Hitler was a "confirmed antisemite" before he left Linz. The historian Brigitte Hamann describes Kubizek's claim as "problematical", because it was made retroactively in 1953. While Hitler states in Mein Kampf that he first became an antisemite in Vienna, Reinhold Hanisch, who helped him to sell his paintings, disagrees. Hitler also sold some of his art through a Jewish businessman named Samuel Morgenstern while living in Vienna. Many of Morgenstern's clients were Jewish; for example, a lawyer named Josef Feingold purchased several of Hitler's paintings of Vienna's historical architecture. The historian Richard J. Evans states that "historians now generally agree that his notorious, murderous antisemitism emerged well after Germany's defeat in World War I, as a product of the paranoid 'stab-in-the-back' explanation for the catastrophe".

Hitler received the final part of his father's estate in May 1913 and moved to Munich. When he was conscripted into the Austro-Hungarian Army, he journeyed to Salzburg on 5 February 1914 for medical assessment. After he was deemed unfit for service, he returned to Munich. Hitler later claimed that he did not wish to serve the Habsburg Empire because of the mixture of races in its army and his belief that the collapse of Austria-Hungary was imminent.

=== World War I ===
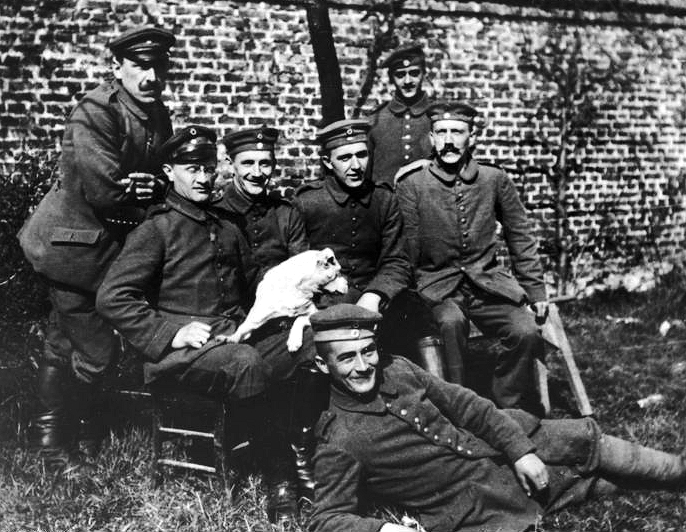
Hitler (far right, seated) with Bavarian Army comrades from the Bavarian Reserve Infantry Regiment 16 (c. 1914–18)

In August 1914, at the outbreak of World War I, Hitler was living in Munich and voluntarily enlisted in the Bavarian Army. According to a 1924 report by the Bavarian authorities, allowing Hitler to serve was most likely an administrative error, because as an Austrian citizen, he should have been returned to Austria.

Posted to the Bavarian Reserve Infantry Regiment 16 (1st Company of the List Regiment), he served as a dispatch runner on the Western Front in France and Belgium, spending nearly half his time at the regimental headquarters in Fournes-en-Weppes, well behind the front lines. In 1914, he was present at the First Battle of Ypres and in that year was decorated for bravery, receiving the Iron Cross, Second Class. During the war, he was saved by his commanding officer, Fritz Wiedemann, who pulled Hitler out of the rubble of a collapsed building while under heavy fire.

During his service at headquarters, Hitler pursued his artistic interests, drawing cartoons and providing instructions for an army newspaper. During the Battle of the Somme in October 1916, he was wounded in the left thigh when a shell exploded in the dispatch runners' dugout. Hitler spent almost two months recovering in hospital at Beelitz, returning to his regiment on 5 March 1917. He was present at the Battle of Arras of 1917 and the Battle of Passchendaele. He received the black Wound Badge on 18 May 1918. Three months later, in August 1918, on a recommendation by Lieutenant Hugo Gutmann, his Jewish superior, Hitler received the Iron Cross, First Class, a decoration rarely awarded at Hitler's Gefreiter rank. On 15 October 1918, he was temporarily blinded in a mustard gas attack and was hospitalised in Pasewalk. While there, Hitler learned of Germany's defeat, and, by his own account, suffered a second bout of blindness after receiving this news.

Hitler described his role in World War I as "the greatest of all experiences" and was praised by his commanding officers for his bravery. His wartime experience reinforced his German patriotism, and he was shocked by Germany's capitulation in November 1918. His displeasure with the collapse of the war effort began to shape his ideology. Like other German nationalists, he believed the Dolchstoßlegende (stab-in-the-back myth), which claimed that the German army, "undefeated in the field", had been "stabbed in the back" on the home front by civilian leaders, Jews, Marxists, and those who signed the armistice that ended the fighting—later dubbed the "November criminals".

The Treaty of Versailles stipulated that Germany had to relinquish several of its territories and demilitarise the Rhineland. The treaty imposed economic sanctions and levied heavy reparations on the country. Many Germans saw the treaty as an unjust humiliation. They especially objected to Article 231, which they interpreted as declaring Germany responsible for the war. The Versailles Treaty and the economic, social, and political conditions in Germany after the war were later exploited by Hitler for political gain.

== Entry into politics ==
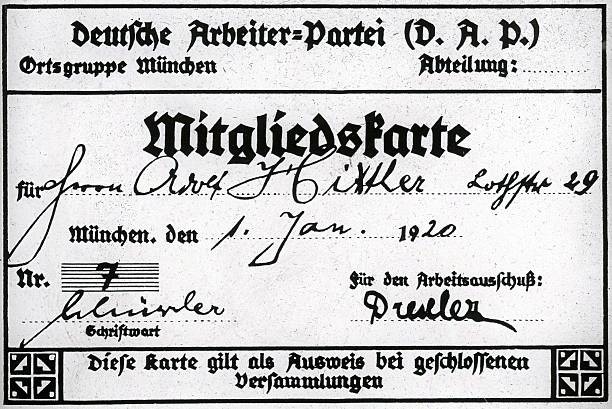
Hitler's German Workers' Party (DAP) membership card

After the war, Hitler returned to Munich. Without formal education or career prospects, he remained in the army. In July 1919, he was appointed Verbindungsmann (intelligence agent) of an Aufklärungskommando (reconnaissance unit) of the Reichswehr, assigned to influence other soldiers and to infiltrate the German Workers' Party (DAP). At a DAP meeting on 12 September 1919, Party chairman Anton Drexler was impressed by Hitler's oratorical skills. He gave him a copy of his pamphlet My Political Awakening, which contained antisemitic, nationalist, anti-capitalist, and anti-Marxist ideas. On the orders of his army superiors, Hitler applied to join the party, and within a week was accepted as party member 555 (the party began counting membership at 500 to give the impression they were a much larger party).

Hitler made his earliest known written statement about the Jewish question in a 16 September 1919 letter to Adolf Gemlich (now known as the Gemlich letter). In the letter, Hitler argues that the aim of the government "must unshakably be the removal of the Jews altogether". At the DAP, Hitler met Dietrich Eckart, one of the party's founders and a member of the occult Thule Society. Eckart became Hitler's mentor, exchanging ideas with him and introducing him to a wide range of Munich society. To increase its appeal, the DAP changed its name to the Nationalsozialistische Deutsche Arbeiterpartei (National Socialist German Workers' Party (NSDAP), now known as the "Nazi Party"). Hitler designed the party's banner of a swastika in a white circle on a red background.

Hitler was discharged from the army on 31 March 1920, and began working full-time for the party. The party headquarters was in Munich, a centre for anti-government German nationalists determined to eliminate Marxism and undermine the Weimar Republic.

Friedrich Reck-Malleczewen commented in his 1947 book Diary of a Man in Despair:

He had come to a house where he had never been before, wearing gaiters, a floppy, wide-brimmed hat, and carrying a riding whip. ... Eventually, he managed to launch into a speech. He talked on and on, endlessly. He preached. He went on at us like a division chaplain in the Army. We did not in the least contradict him, or venture to differ in any way, but he began to bellow at us. The servants thought we were being attacked and rushed in to defend us. When he had gone, we sat silently, confused and not at all amused. There was a feeling of dismay, as when on a train you suddenly find you are sharing a compartment with a psychotic.

In February 1921, already highly effective at crowd manipulation, Hitler spoke to a crowd of over 6,000. To publicise the meeting, two truckloads of party supporters drove around Munich waving swastika flags and distributing leaflets. Hitler soon gained notoriety for his rowdy polemic speeches against the Treaty of Versailles, rival politicians, and especially against Marxists and Jews.

In June 1921, while Hitler and Eckart were on a fundraising trip to Berlin, a mutiny broke out within the Nazi Party in Munich. Members of its executive committee wanted to merge with the Nuremberg-based German Socialist Party (DSP). Hitler returned to Munich on 11 July and angrily tendered his resignation. The committee members realised that the resignation of their leading public figure and speaker would mean the end of the party. Hitler announced he would rejoin on the condition that he would replace Drexler as party chairman, and that the party headquarters would remain in Munich. The committee agreed, and he rejoined the party on 26 July as member 3,680. Hitler continued to face some opposition within the Nazi Party. Opponents of Hitler in the leadership had Hermann Esser expelled from the party, and they printed 3,000 copies of a pamphlet attacking Hitler as a traitor to the party. (Note: Hitler also won a settlement from a libel suit against the socialist paper the Münchener Post, which had questioned his lifestyle and income.Kershaw 2008, p. 99) In the following days, Hitler spoke to several large audiences and defended himself and Esser, to thunderous applause. His strategy proved successful, and at a special party congress on 29 July, he was granted absolute power as party chairman, succeeding Drexler, by a vote of 533 to 1.

Hitler's vitriolic beer hall speeches began attracting regular audiences. A demagogue, he became adept at using populist themes, including the use of scapegoats, who were blamed for his listeners' economic hardships. Hitler used personal magnetism and an understanding of crowd psychology to his advantage while engaged in public speaking. Historians have noted the hypnotic effect of his rhetoric on large audiences, and of his eyes in small groups. Alfons Heck, a former member of the Hitler Youth, recalled:

We erupted into a frenzy of nationalistic pride that bordered on hysteria. For minutes on end, we shouted at the top of our lungs, with tears streaming down our faces: Sieg Heil, Sieg Heil, Sieg Heil! From that moment on, I belonged to Adolf Hitler body and soul.

Early followers included Rudolf Hess, the former air force ace Hermann Göring, and the army captain Ernst Röhm. Röhm became head of the Nazis' paramilitary organisation, the Sturmabteilung (SA, "Stormtroopers"), which protected meetings and attacked political opponents. A critical influence on Hitler's thinking during this period was the Aufbau Vereinigung, a conspiratorial group of White Russian exiles and early Nazis. The group, financed with funds channelled from wealthy industrialists, introduced Hitler to the idea of a Jewish conspiracy, linking international finance with Bolshevism.

The programme of the Nazi Party was laid out in their 25-point programme on 24 February 1920. This did not represent a coherent ideology, but was a conglomeration of received ideas which had currency in the völkisch pan-Germanic movement, such as ultranationalism, opposition to the Treaty of Versailles, distrust of capitalism, as well as some socialist ideas. For Hitler, the most important aspect of it was its strong antisemitic stance. He also perceived the programme as primarily a basis for propaganda and for attracting people to the party.

=== Beer Hall Putsch and Landsberg Prison ===
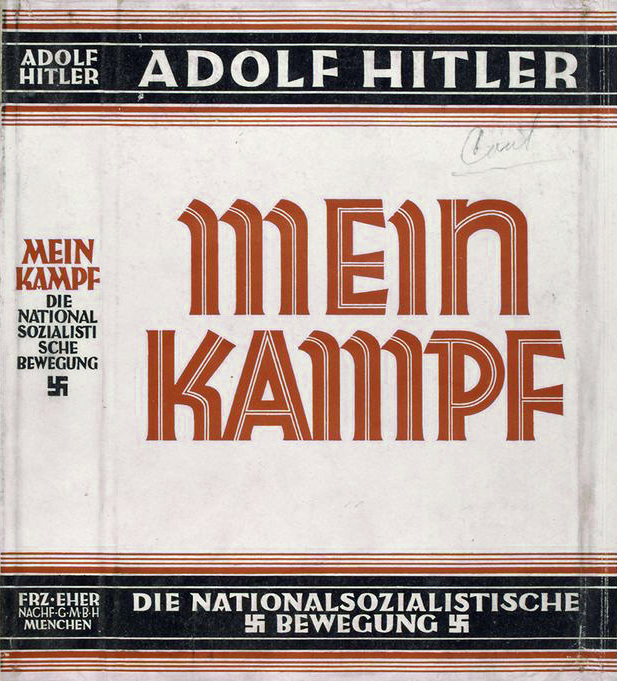
The dust jacket of Mein Kampf's 1926–28 edition, which Hitler authored in 1925

In 1923, Hitler enlisted the help of World War I General Erich Ludendorff for an attempted coup known as the Beer Hall Putsch. The Nazi Party used Italian Fascism as a model for their appearance and policies. Hitler wanted to emulate Benito Mussolini's March on Rome in 1922 by staging his own coup in Bavaria, to be followed by a challenge to the government in Berlin. Hitler and Ludendorff sought the support of Staatskommissar (State Commissioner) Gustav Ritter von Kahr, Bavaria's de facto ruler. However, Kahr, along with Police Chief Hans Ritter von Seisser and Reichswehr General Otto von Lossow, wanted to install a nationalist dictatorship without Hitler.

On 8 November 1923, Hitler and the SA stormed a public meeting of 3,000 people organised by Kahr in the Bürgerbräukeller, a beer hall in Munich. Interrupting Kahr's speech, he announced that the national revolution had begun and declared the formation of a new government with Ludendorff. Retiring to a back room, Hitler, with his pistol drawn, demanded and subsequently received the support of Kahr, Seisser, and Lossow. Hitler's forces initially succeeded in occupying the local Reichswehr and police headquarters, but Kahr and his cohorts quickly withdrew their support. Neither the Army nor the state police joined forces with Hitler. The next day, Hitler and his followers marched from the beer hall to the Bavarian War Ministry to overthrow the Bavarian government, but police dispersed them. In the failed coup, 16 Nazi Party members and four police officers were killed.

Hitler fled to the home of Ernst Hanfstaengl and by some accounts contemplated suicide. He was depressed but calm when arrested on 11 November 1923 for high treason. His trial began on 26 February 1924, and Alfred Rosenberg became the temporary leader of the Nazi Party. On 1 April, Hitler was sentenced to five years' Festungshaft ('fortress confinement') at Landsberg Prison. There, he received friendly treatment from the guards and was allowed mail from supporters and regular visits by party comrades. Pardoned by the Bavarian Supreme Court, he was released from jail on 20 December 1924, against the state prosecutor's objections. Including time on remand, Hitler served just over one year in prison.

While at Landsberg, Hitler dictated most of the first volume of Mein Kampf ('my struggle'; originally titled Four and a Half Years of Struggle against Lies, Stupidity, and Cowardice) at first to his chauffeur, Emil Maurice, and then to his deputy, Rudolf Hess. The book, dedicated to Thule Society member Dietrich Eckart, was an autobiography and exposition of his ideology. The book laid out Hitler's plans for territorial expansion as well as transforming German society into a dictatorship based on race. Throughout the book, Jews are equated with "germs" and presented as the "international poisoners" of society. According to Hitler's ideology, the only solution was their extermination. While Hitler did not describe exactly how this was to be accomplished, his "inherent genocidal thrust is undeniable", according to Ian Kershaw.

Published in two volumes in 1925 and 1926, Mein Kampf sold 228,000 copies between 1925 and 1932. One million copies were sold in 1933, Hitler's first year in office. Shortly before Hitler was eligible for parole, the Bavarian government attempted to have him deported to Austria. The Austrian federal chancellor rejected the request on the specious grounds that his service in the German Army made his Austrian citizenship void. In response, Hitler formally renounced his Austrian citizenship on 7 April 1925.

=== Rebuilding the Nazi Party ===
At the time of Hitler's release from prison, politics in Germany had become less combative, and the economy had improved, limiting Hitler's opportunities for political agitation. As a result of the failed Beer Hall Putsch, the Nazi Party and its affiliated organisations were banned in Bavaria. In a meeting with the prime minister of Bavaria, Heinrich Held, on 4 January 1925, Hitler agreed to respect the state's authority and promised that he would seek political power only through the democratic process. The meeting paved the way for the ban on the Nazi Party to be lifted on 16 February.

However, after an inflammatory speech he gave on 27 February, Hitler was barred from public speaking by the Bavarian authorities, a ban that remained in place until 1927. To advance his political ambitions despite the ban, Hitler appointed Gregor Strasser, Otto Strasser, and Joseph Goebbels to organise and enlarge the Nazi Party in northern Germany. Gregor Strasser steered a more independent political course, emphasising the socialist elements of the party's programme.

The stock market in the United States crashed on 24 October 1929. The impact in Germany was dire: millions became unemployed, and several major banks collapsed. Hitler and the Nazi Party prepared to take advantage of the emergency to gain support for their party. They promised to repudiate the Versailles Treaty, strengthen the economy, and provide jobs.

Hitler discussed the name of the Nazi Party in October 1923:

"Why," I asked Hitler, "do you call yourself a National Socialist, since your party program is the very antithesis of that commonly accredited to socialism?" "Socialism," he retorted, putting down his cup of tea, pugnaciously, "is the science of dealing with the common weal. Communism is not Socialism. Marxism is not Socialism. The Marxians have stolen the term and confused its meaning. I shall take Socialism away from the Socialists. Socialism is an ancient Aryan, Germanic institution. ... We demand the fulfilment of the just claims of the productive classes by the state based on race solidarity. To us, state and race are one."

== Rise to power ==
Nazi Party election results
Election	Total votes	% votes	Reichstag seats	Notes
May 1924	1,918,300	6.5	32	Hitler in prison
December 1924	907,300	3.0	14	Hitler released from prison
May 1928	810,100	2.6	12	
September 1930	6,409,600	18.3	107	After the financial crisis
July 1932	13,745,000	37.3	230	After Hitler was candidate for presidency
November 1932	11,737,000	33.1	196	
March 1933	17,277,180	43.9	288	Only partially free during Hitler's term as chancellor of Germany

=== Brüning administration ===
The Great Depression provided a political opportunity for Hitler. Germans were ambivalent about the parliamentary republic, which faced challenges from right- and left-wing extremists. The moderate political parties were increasingly unable to stem the tide of extremism, and the German referendum of 1929 helped to elevate Nazi ideology. The elections of September 1930 resulted in the break-up of a grand coalition and its replacement with a minority cabinet. Its leader, chancellor Heinrich Brüning of the Centre Party, governed through emergency decrees from President Paul von Hindenburg. Governance by decree became the new norm, paving the way for authoritarian forms of government. The Nazi Party rose from obscurity to win 18.3 per cent of the vote and 107 parliamentary seats in the 1930 election, becoming the second-largest party in parliament.

Hitler made a prominent appearance at the trial of two Reichswehr officers, Lieutenants Richard Scheringer and Hanns Ludin, in late 1930. Both were charged with membership in the Nazi Party, at that time illegal for Reichswehr personnel. The prosecution argued that the Nazi Party was extremist, prompting defence lawyer Hans Frank to call on Hitler to testify. On 25 September 1930, Hitler testified that his party would pursue political power solely through democratic elections, which won him many supporters in the officer corps.

Brüning's austerity measures brought little economic improvement and were extremely unpopular. Hitler exploited this by targeting his political messages specifically at people who had been affected by the inflation of the 1920s and the Depression, such as farmers, war veterans, and the middle class.

Although Hitler had terminated his Austrian citizenship in 1925, he did not acquire German citizenship for almost seven years. This meant that he was stateless, legally unable to run for public office, and still faced the risk of deportation. On 25 February 1932, the interior minister of Brunswick, Dietrich Klagges, who was a member of the Nazi Party, appointed Hitler as administrator for the state's delegation to the Reichsrat in Berlin, making Hitler a citizen of Brunswick, and thus of Germany.

Hitler ran against Hindenburg in the 1932 presidential election. A speech to the Industry Club in Düsseldorf on 27 January 1932 won him support from many of Germany's most powerful industrialists. Hindenburg had support from various nationalist, monarchist, Catholic, and republican parties, and some Social Democrats. Hitler used the campaign slogan "Hitler über Deutschland" ("Hitler over Germany"), a reference to his political ambitions and his campaigning by aircraft. He was one of the first politicians to use aircraft travel for campaigning and used it effectively. Hitler came in second in both rounds of the election, garnering more than 35 per cent of the vote in the final election. Although he lost to Hindenburg, this election established Hitler as a strong force in German politics.

=== Appointment as chancellor ===
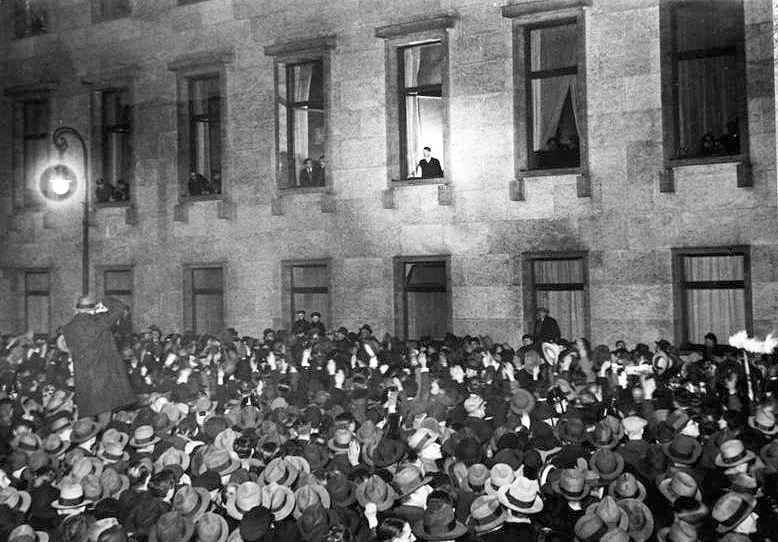
Hitler, at a window of the Reich Chancellery, receives an ovation on the evening of his inauguration as chancellor, 30 January 1933

The absence of an effective government prompted two influential politicians, Franz von Papen and Alfred Hugenberg, along with several other industrialists and businessmen, to write a letter to Hindenburg. The signers urged Hindenburg to appoint Hitler as leader of a government "independent from parliamentary parties", which could turn into a movement that would "enrapture millions of people".

Hindenburg reluctantly agreed to appoint Hitler as chancellor after two further parliamentary elections—in July and November 1932—had not resulted in the formation of a majority government. Hitler headed a short-lived coalition government formed by the Nazi Party (which had the most seats in the Reichstag) and Hugenberg's party, the German National People's Party (DNVP). On 30 January 1933, the new cabinet was sworn in during a brief ceremony in Hindenburg's office. The Nazi Party gained three posts: Hitler was named chancellor, Wilhelm Frick Minister of the Interior, and Hermann Göring Minister of the Interior for Prussia. Hitler had insisted on the ministerial positions as a way to gain control over the police in much of Germany.

=== Reichstag fire and March elections ===
As chancellor, Hitler worked against attempts by the Nazi Party's opponents to build a majority government. Because of the political stalemate, he asked Hindenburg to again dissolve the Reichstag, and elections were scheduled for early March. On 27 February 1933, the Reichstag building was set on fire. Göring blamed a communist plot, as the Dutch communist Marinus van der Lubbe was found in incriminating circumstances inside the burning building. Until the 1960s, some historians, including William L. Shirer and Alan Bullock, thought the Nazi Party was responsible; now the view of most historians is van der Lubbe started the fire alone.

At Hitler's urging, Hindenburg responded by signing the Reichstag Fire Decree of 28 February, drafted by the Nazis, which suspended basic rights and allowed detention without trial. The decree was permitted under Article 48 of the Weimar Constitution, which gave the president the power to take emergency measures to protect public safety and order. Activities of the German Communist Party (KPD) were suppressed, and 4,000 KPD members were arrested.

In addition to political campaigning, the Nazi Party engaged in paramilitary violence and the spread of anti-communist propaganda, in the days preceding the election. On election day, 6 March 1933, the Nazis’ share of the vote increased to 44%, and the party acquired the largest number of seats in parliament. Hitler's party failed to secure an absolute majority, necessitating another coalition with the DNVP.

=== Day of Potsdam and the Enabling Act ===
On 21 March 1933, the new Reichstag was constituted with an opening ceremony at the Garrison Church in Potsdam. This "Day of Potsdam" was held to demonstrate unity between the Nazi movement and the old Prussian elite and military. Hitler appeared in a morning coat and humbly greeted Hindenburg.

To achieve full political control despite not having an absolute majority in parliament, Hitler's government brought the Ermächtigungsgesetz (Enabling Act) to a vote in the newly elected Reichstag. The Act—officially titled the Gesetz zur Behebung der Not von Volk und Reich ("Law to Remedy the Distress of People and Reich")—gave Hitler's cabinet the power to enact laws without the consent of the Reichstag for four years. These laws could (with certain exceptions) deviate from the constitution.

Since it would affect the constitution, the Enabling Act required a two-thirds majority to pass. Leaving nothing to chance, the Nazis used the provisions of the Reichstag Fire Decree to arrest all 81 Communist deputies (in spite of their virulent campaign against the party, the Nazis had allowed the KPD to contest the election) and prevent several Social Democrats from attending.

On 23 March 1933, the Reichstag assembled at the Kroll Opera House under turbulent circumstances. Ranks of SA men served as guards inside the building, while large groups outside, opposing the proposed legislation, shouted slogans and threats towards the arriving members of parliament. After Hitler verbally promised Centre party leader Ludwig Kaas that Hindenburg would retain his power of veto, Kaas announced the Centre Party would support the Enabling Act. The Act was passed by a vote of 444–94, with all parties except the Social Democrats voting in favour. The Enabling Act, along with the Reichstag Fire Decree, transformed Hitler's government into a de facto legal dictatorship.

=== Dictatorship ===
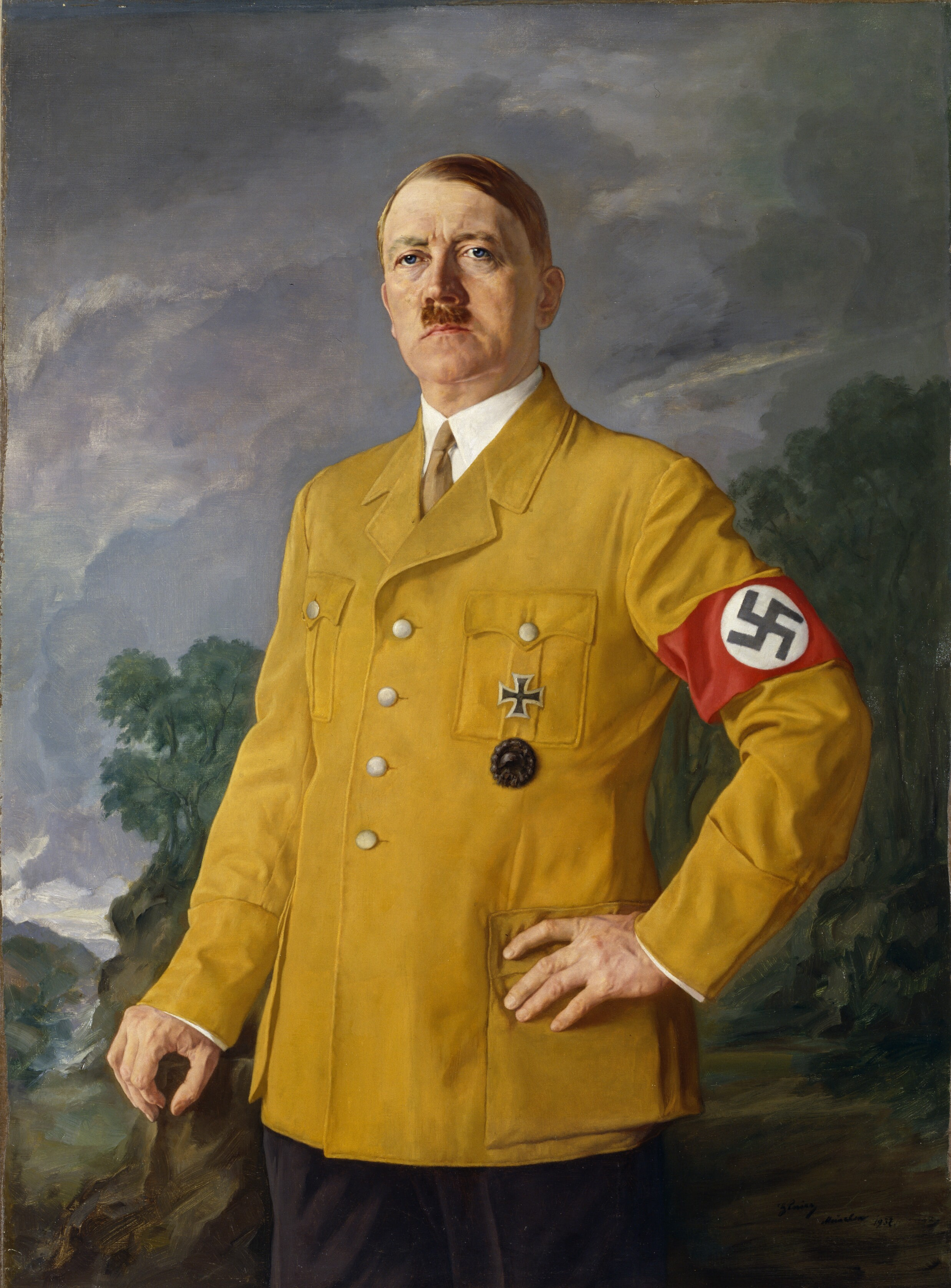
Portrait by Heinrich Knirr (1937)

At the risk of appearing to talk nonsense, I tell you that the National Socialist movement will go on for 1,000 years! ... Don't forget how people laughed at me 15 years ago when I declared that one day I would govern Germany. They laugh now, just as foolishly, when I declare that I shall remain in power!

— Adolf Hitler to a British correspondent in Berlin, June 1934

Having achieved full control over the legislative and executive branches of government, Hitler and his allies began to suppress the remaining opposition. The Social Democratic Party was made illegal, and its assets were seized. While many trade union delegates were in Berlin for May Day activities, SA stormtroopers occupied union offices around the country. On 2 May 1933, all trade unions were forced to dissolve, and their leaders were arrested. Some were sent to concentration camps. The German Labour Front was formed as an umbrella organisation to represent all workers, administrators, and company owners, thus reflecting the concept of Nazism in the spirit of Hitler's Volksgemeinschaft ("people's community").

By the end of June, the other parties had been intimidated into disbanding. This included the Nazis' nominal coalition partner, the DNVP; with the SA's help, Hitler forced its leader, Hugenberg, to resign on 29 June. On 14 July 1933, the Nazi Party was declared the only legal political party in Germany. The demands of the SA for more political and military power caused anxiety among military, industrial, and political leaders. In response, Hitler purged the entire SA leadership in the Night of the Long Knives, which took place from 30 June to 2 July 1934. Hitler targeted Ernst Röhm and other SA leaders who, along with several Hitler's political adversaries (such as Gregor Strasser and former chancellor Kurt von Schleicher), were rounded up, arrested, and shot. While the international community and some Germans were shocked by the killings, many in Germany believed Hitler was restoring order.

Hindenburg died on 2 August 1934. On the previous day, the cabinet had enacted the Law Concerning the Head of State of the German Reich. This law stated that upon Hindenburg's death, the office of president would be abolished, and its powers merged with those of the chancellor. Hitler thus became head of state as well as head of government and was formally named as Führer und Reichskanzler (Leader and Chancellor of the Reich), although Reichskanzler was eventually dropped. With this action, Hitler eliminated the last legal remedy by which he could be removed from office.

As head of state, Hitler became commander-in-chief of the armed forces. Immediately after Hindenburg's death, at the instigation of the leadership of the Reichswehr, the traditional loyalty oath of soldiers was altered to affirm loyalty to Hitler personally, by name, rather than to the office of commander-in-chief (which was later renamed to supreme commander) or to Germany. On 19 August, the merger of the presidency with the chancellorship was approved by 88 per cent of the electorate voting in a plebiscite.

In early 1938, Hitler used blackmail to consolidate his hold over the military by instigating the Blomberg–Fritsch affair. Hitler forced his War Minister, Field Marshal Werner von Blomberg, to resign by using a police dossier that showed that Blomberg's new wife had a record for prostitution. Army commander Colonel-General Werner von Fritsch was removed after the Schutzstaffel (SS) produced allegations that he had engaged in a homosexual relationship. Both men had fallen into disfavour because they objected to Hitler's demand to make the Wehrmacht ready for war as early as 1938. Hitler assumed Blomberg's title of Commander-in-Chief, thus taking personal command of the armed forces. He replaced the Ministry of War with the Oberkommando der Wehrmacht (OKW), headed by General Wilhelm Keitel. On the same day, 16 generals were stripped of their commands, and 44 more were transferred; all were suspected of not being sufficiently pro-Nazi. By early February 1938, 12 more generals had been removed.

Hitler took care to give his dictatorship the appearance of legality. Many of his decrees were explicitly based on the Reichstag Fire Decree and hence on Article 48 of the Weimar Constitution. The Reichstag renewed the Enabling Act twice, each time for four years. While elections to the Reichstag were still held (in 1933, 1936, and 1938), voters were presented with a single list of Nazis and pro-Nazi "guests" which received well over 90 per cent of the vote. These sham elections were held in far-from-secret conditions; the Nazis threatened severe reprisals against anyone who did not vote or who voted against.

== Nazi Germany ==
=== Economy and culture ===
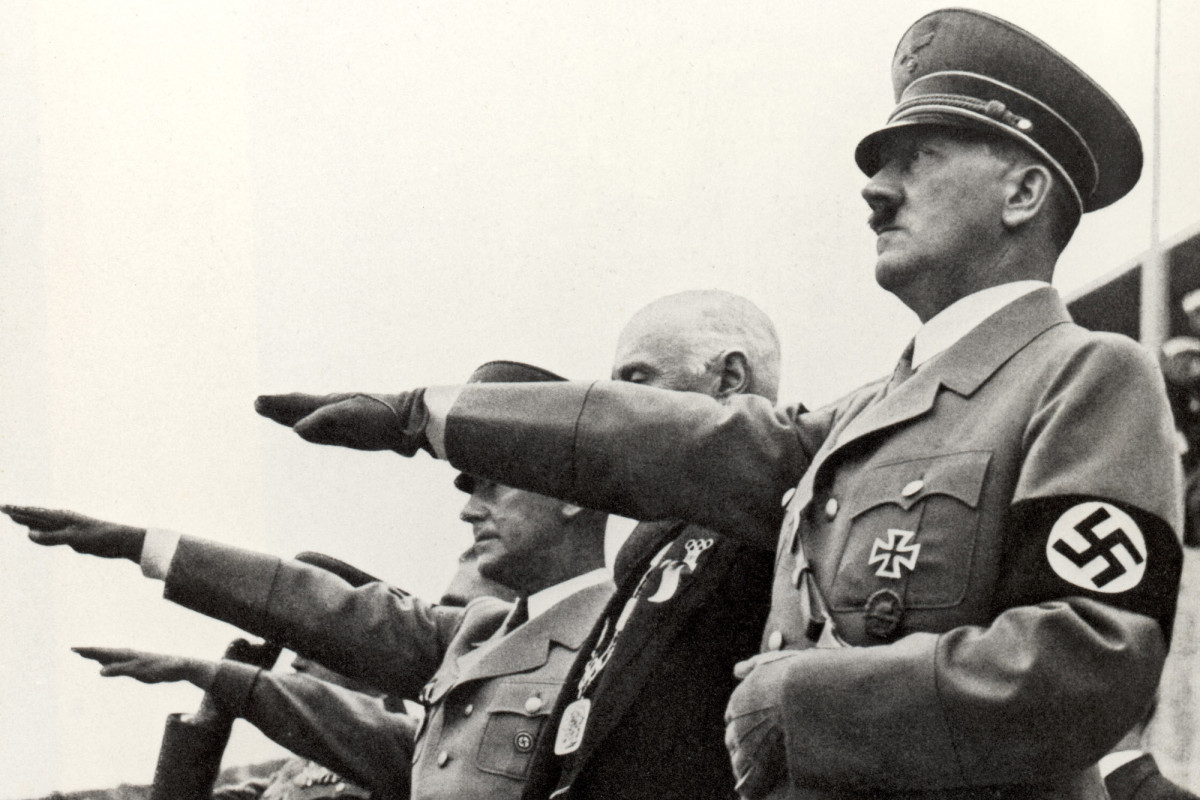
Hitler and his staff doing a Nazi salute towards the teams during the opening ceremonies of the XI Olympic Games in August 1936

In August 1934, Hitler appointed Reichsbank President Hjalmar Schacht as Minister of Economics, and in the following year, as Plenipotentiary for War Economy in charge of preparing the economy for war. Reconstruction and rearmament were financed through Mefo bills, printing money, and seizing the assets of people arrested as enemies of the state, including Jews. The number of unemployed fell from six million in 1932 to fewer than one million in 1936. Hitler oversaw one of the largest infrastructure improvement campaigns in German history, leading to the construction of dams, autobahns, railroads, and other civil works. Wages were slightly lower in the mid- to late 1930s compared with wages during the Weimar Republic, while the cost of living increased by 25 per cent. The average workweek increased during the shift to a war economy; by 1939, the average German was working between 47 and 50 hours a week.

Hitler's government sponsored architecture on an immense scale. Albert Speer, instrumental in implementing Hitler's classicist reinterpretation of German culture, was placed in charge of the proposed architectural renovations of Berlin. Despite a threatened multi-nation boycott, Germany hosted the 1936 Olympic Games. Hitler officiated at the opening ceremonies and attended events at both the Winter Games in Garmisch-Partenkirchen and the Summer Games in Berlin.

=== Rearmament and new alliances ===
In a meeting with German military leaders on 3 February 1933, Hitler spoke of "conquest for Lebensraum in the East and its ruthless Germanisation" as his ultimate foreign policy objectives. In March, Prince Bernhard Wilhelm von Bülow, secretary at the Foreign Office (Auswärtiges Amt), issued a statement of major foreign policy aims: Anschluss with Austria, the restoration of Germany's national borders of 1914, rejection of military restrictions under the Treaty of Versailles, the return of the former German colonies in Africa, and a German zone of influence in Eastern Europe. Hitler found Bülow's goals to be too modest. In speeches during this period, he stressed what he termed the peaceful goals of his policies and a willingness to work within international agreements. At the first meeting of his cabinet in 1933, Hitler prioritised military spending over unemployment relief.

Germany withdrew from the League of Nations and the World Disarmament Conference in October 1933. In January 1935, over 90 per cent of the people of the Saarland, then under League of Nations administration, voted to unite with Germany. That March, Hitler announced an expansion of the Wehrmacht to 600,000 members—six times the number permitted by the Versailles Treaty—including development of an air force (Luftwaffe) and an increase in the size of the navy (Kriegsmarine). Britain, France, Italy, and the League of Nations condemned these violations of the Treaty but did nothing to stop them. The Anglo-German Naval Agreement (AGNA) of 18 June allowed German tonnage to increase to 35 per cent of that of the Royal Navy. Hitler called the signing of the AGNA "the happiest day of his life", believing that the agreement marked the beginning of the Anglo-German alliance he had predicted in Mein Kampf. France and Italy were not consulted before the signing, directly undermining the League of Nations and setting the Treaty of Versailles on the path towards irrelevance.

Germany reoccupied the demilitarised zone in the Rhineland in March 1936, in violation of the Versailles Treaty. Hitler also sent troops to Spain to support Francisco Franco and his Nationalist faction during the Spanish Civil War after receiving an appeal for help in July 1936. At the same time, Hitler continued his efforts to create an Anglo-German alliance. In August 1936, in response to a growing economic crisis caused by his rearmament efforts, Hitler ordered Göring to implement a Four Year Plan to prepare Germany for war within the next four years. The plan envisaged an all-out struggle between "Judaeo-Bolshevism" and German Nazism, which in Hitler's view required a committed effort of rearmament regardless of the economic costs.

In October 1936, Count Galeazzo Ciano, foreign minister of Mussolini's government, visited Germany, where he signed a Nine-Point Protocol as an expression of rapprochement and had a personal meeting with Hitler. On 1 November, Mussolini declared an "axis" between Germany and Italy. On 25 November, Germany signed the Anti-Comintern Pact with Japan. Britain, China, Italy, and Poland were also invited to join the Anti-Comintern Pact, but only Italy signed in 1937. Hitler abandoned his plan of an Anglo-German alliance, blaming "inadequate" British leadership. At a meeting in the Reich Chancellery with his foreign ministers and military chiefs that November, Hitler restated his intention of acquiring Lebensraum for the German people. He ordered preparations for war in the East to begin as early as 1938 and no later than 1943. In the event of his death, the conference minutes, recorded as the Hossbach Memorandum, were to be regarded as his "political testament". He felt that a severe decline in living standards in Germany as a result of the economic crisis could only be stopped by military aggression aimed at seizing Austria and Czechoslovakia. Hitler urged quick action before Britain and France gained a permanent lead in the arms race. In early 1938, in the wake of the Blomberg–Fritsch affair, Hitler asserted control of the military-foreign policy apparatus, dismissing Neurath as foreign minister and appointing himself as War Minister. From early 1938 onwards, Hitler was carrying out a foreign policy ultimately aimed at war.

== World War II ==
=== Early diplomatic successes ===
==== Alliance with Japan ====
Hitler (right) with Yōsuke Matsuoka (left), the Minister for Foreign Affairs of the Empire of Japan

In February 1938, on the advice of his newly appointed foreign minister, the strongly pro-Japanese Joachim von Ribbentrop, Hitler ended the Sino-German alliance with the Republic of China to instead enter into an alliance with the more modern and powerful Empire of Japan. Hitler announced German recognition of Manchukuo, the Japanese puppet state in Manchuria, and renounced German claims to their former colonies in the Pacific held by Japan. Hitler ordered an end to arms shipments to China and recalled all German officers working with the Chinese Army. In retaliation, Chinese General Chiang Kai-shek cancelled all Sino-German economic agreements, depriving the Germans of many Chinese raw materials.

==== Austria and Czechoslovakia ====
On 12 March 1938, Hitler announced the unification of Austria with Germany in the Anschluss. Hitler then turned his attention to the ethnic German population of the Sudetenland region of Czechoslovakia. On 28–29 March 1938, Hitler held a series of secret meetings in Berlin with Konrad Henlein of the Sudeten German Party, the largest of the ethnic German parties of the Sudetenland. The men agreed that Henlein would demand increased autonomy for Sudeten Germans from the Czechoslovak government, thus providing a pretext for German military action against Czechoslovakia. In April 1938, Henlein told the foreign minister of Hungary that "whatever the Czech government might offer, he would always raise still higher demands ... he wanted to sabotage an understanding by any means because this was the only method to blow up Czechoslovakia quickly". In private, Hitler considered the Sudeten issue unimportant; his real intention was a war of conquest against Czechoslovakia.

In April, Hitler ordered the OKW to prepare for Fall Grün (Case Green), the code name for an invasion of Czechoslovakia. As a result of intense French and British diplomatic pressure, on 5 September, Czechoslovak president Edvard Beneš unveiled the "Fourth Plan" for constitutional reorganisation of his country, which agreed to most of Henlein's demands for Sudeten autonomy. Henlein's party responded to Beneš's offer by instigating a series of violent clashes with the Czechoslovak police that led to the declaration of martial law in certain Sudeten districts.

Germany was dependent on imported oil; a confrontation with Britain over the Czechoslovak dispute could curtail Germany's oil supplies. This forced Hitler to call off Fall Grün, originally planned for 1 October 1938. On 29 September, Hitler, Neville Chamberlain, Édouard Daladier, and Mussolini attended a one-day conference in Munich that led to the Munich Agreement, which handed over the Sudetenland districts to Germany.

Chamberlain was satisfied with the Munich conference, calling the outcome "peace for our time", while Hitler was angered about the missed opportunity for war in 1938; he expressed his disappointment in a speech on 9 October in Saarbrücken. In Hitler's view, the British-brokered peace, although favourable to the ostensible German demands, was a diplomatic defeat which spurred his intent of limiting British power to pave the way for the eastern expansion of Germany. As a result of the summit, Hitler was selected Time magazine's Man of the Year for 1938. In late 1938 and early 1939, the continuing economic crisis caused by rearmament forced Hitler to make major defence cuts. In his "Export or die" speech of 30 January 1939, he called for an economic offensive to increase German foreign exchange holdings to pay for raw materials such as high-grade iron needed for military weapons.

On 14 March 1939, under threat from Hungary, Slovakia declared independence and received protection from Germany. The next day, in violation of the Munich Agreement and possibly as a result of the deepening economic crisis requiring additional assets, Hitler ordered the Wehrmacht to invade the Czech rump state, and from Prague Castle he proclaimed the territory a German protectorate.

=== Start of World War II ===
In private discussions in 1939, Hitler declared Britain the main enemy to be defeated and that Poland's obliteration was a necessary prelude for that goal. The eastern flank would be secured, and land would be added to Germany's Lebensraum. Offended by the British "guarantee" on 31 March 1939 of Polish independence, he said, "I shall brew them a devil's drink". In a speech in Wilhelmshaven for the launch of the battleship Tirpitz on 1 April, he threatened to denounce the Anglo-German Naval Agreement if the British continued to guarantee Polish independence, which he perceived as an "encirclement" policy. Poland was to either become a German satellite state, or it would be neutralised to secure the Reich's eastern flank and prevent a possible British blockade.

Hitler initially favoured the idea of a satellite state, but upon its rejection by the Polish government, he decided to invade and made this the main foreign policy goal of 1939. On 3 April, Hitler ordered the military to prepare for Fall Weiss ("Case White"), the plan for invading Poland on 25 August. In a Reichstag speech on 28 April, he renounced both the Anglo-German Naval Agreement and the German–Polish Non-Aggression Pact. Historians such as William Carr, Gerhard Weinberg, and Ian Kershaw have argued that one reason for Hitler's rush to war was his fear of an early death. He had repeatedly claimed that he must lead Germany into war before he got too old, as his successors might lack his strength of will. Hitler was concerned that a military attack against Poland could result in a premature war with Britain. Hitler's foreign minister and former Ambassador to London, Joachim von Ribbentrop, assured him that neither Britain nor France would honour its commitments to Poland. Accordingly, on 22 August 1939, Hitler ordered a military mobilisation against Poland.

This plan required tacit Soviet support, and the non-aggression pact (the Molotov–Ribbentrop Pact) between Germany and the Soviet Union, led by Joseph Stalin, included a secret agreement to partition Poland between the two countries. Contrary to Ribbentrop's prediction that Britain would sever Anglo-Polish ties, Britain and Poland signed the Anglo-Polish alliance on 25 August 1939. This, along with news from Italy that Mussolini would not honour the Pact of Steel, prompted Hitler to postpone the attack on Poland from 25 August to 1 September. Hitler unsuccessfully tried to manoeuvre the British into neutrality by offering them a non-aggression guarantee on 25 August; he then instructed Ribbentrop to present a last-minute peace plan with an impossibly short time limit in an effort to blame the imminent war on British and Polish inaction.

On 1 September 1939, Germany invaded western Poland under the pretext of having been denied claims to the Free City of Danzig and the right to extraterritorial roads across the Polish Corridor, which Germany had ceded under the Versailles Treaty. In response, Britain and France declared war on Germany on 3 September, surprising Hitler and prompting him to angrily ask Ribbentrop, "Now what?" Britain and France did not act on their declarations immediately, and on 17 September, Soviet forces invaded eastern Poland.

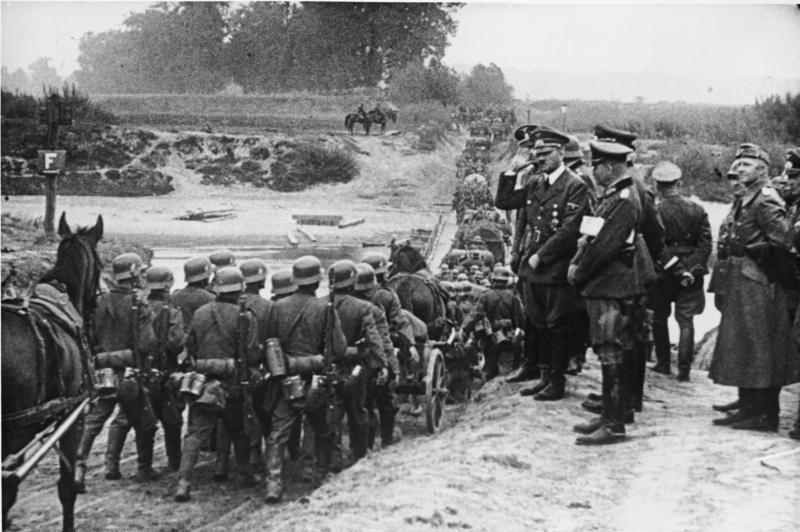
Hitler reviews troops on the march during the Invasion of Poland, September 1939

The fall of Poland was followed by what contemporary journalists dubbed the "Phoney War" or Sitzkrieg ("sitting war"). Hitler instructed the two newly appointed Gauleiters of north-western Poland, Albert Forster of Reichsgau Danzig-West Prussia and Arthur Greiser of Reichsgau Wartheland, to Germanise their areas, with "no questions asked" about how this was accomplished. In Forster's area, ethnic Poles merely had to sign forms stating that they had German blood. In contrast, Greiser agreed with Himmler and carried out an ethnic cleansing campaign towards Poles. Greiser soon complained that Forster was allowing thousands of Poles to be accepted as "racial" Germans and thus endangered German "racial purity". Hitler refrained from getting involved. This inaction has been cited as an example of the theory of "working towards the Führer", in which Hitler issued vague instructions and expected his subordinates to develop policies independently.

Another dispute pitched one side represented by Heinrich Himmler and Greiser, who championed ethnic cleansing in Poland, against another represented by Göring and Hans Frank (governor-general of occupied Poland), who called for turning Poland into the "granary" of the Reich. On 12 February 1940, the dispute was initially settled in favour of the Göring–Frank view, which ended the economically disruptive mass expulsions. On 15 May 1940, Himmler issued a memo entitled "Some Thoughts on the Treatment of Alien Population in the East", calling for the expulsion of the entire Jewish population of Europe into Africa and the reduction of the Polish population to a "leaderless class of labourers". Hitler called Himmler's memo "good and correct", and, ignoring Göring and Frank, implemented the Himmler–Greiser policy in Poland.

On 9 April, German forces invaded Denmark and Norway. On the same day, Hitler proclaimed the birth of the Greater Germanic Reich, his vision of a united empire of Germanic nations of Europe in which the Dutch, Flemish, and Scandinavians were joined into a "racially pure" polity under German leadership. In May 1940, Germany attacked France, and conquered Luxembourg, the Netherlands, and Belgium. These victories prompted Mussolini to have Italy join forces with Hitler on 10 June. France and Germany signed an armistice on 22 June. Kershaw notes that Hitler's popularity within Germany—and German support for the war—reached its peak when he returned to Berlin on 6 July from his tour of Paris. Following the unexpected swift victory, Hitler promoted 12 generals to the rank of field marshal during the 1940 Field Marshal Ceremony.

Britain, whose troops were forced to evacuate France by sea from Dunkirk, continued to fight alongside other British dominions in the Battle of the Atlantic. Hitler made peace overtures to the new British prime minister, Winston Churchill, and upon their rejection, he ordered a series of aerial attacks on Royal Air Force airbases and radar stations in southeast England. On 7 September, the systematic nightly bombing of London began. The German Luftwaffe failed to defeat the Royal Air Force in what became known as the Battle of Britain. By the end of September, Hitler realised that air superiority for the invasion of Britain (in Operation Sea Lion) could not be achieved, and ordered the operation postponed. The nightly air raids on British cities intensified and continued for months, including London, Plymouth, and Coventry.

On 27 September 1940, the Tripartite Pact was signed in Berlin by Saburō Kurusu of Imperial Japan, Hitler, and Italian foreign minister Ciano, and later expanded to include Hungary, Romania, and Bulgaria, thus yielding the Axis powers. Hitler's attempt to integrate the Soviet Union into the anti-British bloc failed after inconclusive talks between Hitler and Molotov in Berlin in November, and he ordered preparations for the invasion of the Soviet Union.

In early 1941, German forces were deployed to North Africa, the Balkans, and the Middle East. In February, German forces arrived in Libya to bolster the Italian presence. In April, Hitler launched the invasion of Yugoslavia, quickly followed by the invasion of Greece. In May, German forces were sent to support Iraqi forces fighting against the British and to invade Crete. On 28 November, Hitler met in Berlin with Amin al-Husseini, the Grand Mufti of Jerusalem. Hitler framed opposition to a Jewish homeland as part of Germany's broader "struggle against the Jews."

=== Path to defeat ===
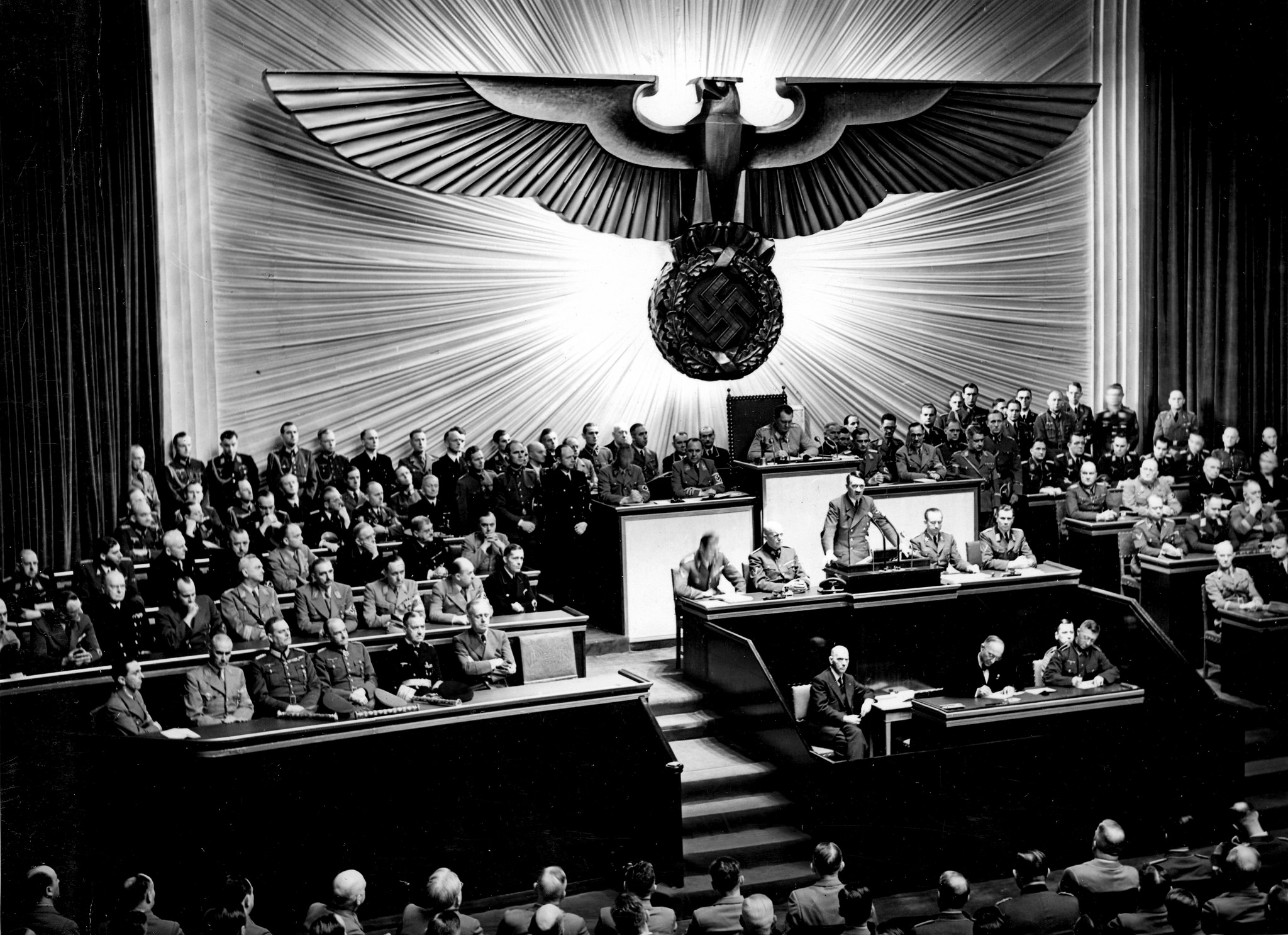
Hitler announcing the declaration of war against the United States to the Reichstag on 11 December 1941

On 22 June 1941, contravening the Molotov–Ribbentrop Pact of 1939, over three million Axis troops attacked the Soviet Union. This offensive (codenamed Operation Barbarossa) was intended to destroy the Soviet Union and seize its natural resources for subsequent aggression against the Western powers. The action was also part of the overall plan to obtain more living space for German people; and Hitler thought a successful invasion would force Britain to negotiate a surrender. The invasion conquered a huge area, including the Baltic republics, Belarus, and West Ukraine. By early August, Axis troops had advanced 500 km (310 miles) and won the Battle of Smolensk. Hitler ordered Army Group Centre to temporarily halt its advance to Moscow and divert its Panzer groups to aid in the encirclement of Leningrad and Kiev. His generals disagreed with this change, having advanced within 400 km (250 miles) of Moscow, and his decision caused a crisis among the military leadership. The pause provided the Red Army with an opportunity to mobilise fresh reserves; the historian Russel Stolfi considers it to be one of the major factors that caused the failure of the Moscow offensive, which was resumed in October 1941 and ended disastrously in December. During this crisis, Hitler appointed himself as head of the Oberkommando des Heeres.

On 7 December 1941, Japan attacked the American fleet based at Pearl Harbor, Hawaii. Four days later, Hitler declared war against the United States. On 18 December 1941, Himmler asked Hitler, "What to do with the Jews of Russia?", to which Hitler replied, "als Partisanen auszurotten" ("exterminate them as partisans"). The Israeli historian Yehuda Bauer has commented that the remark is probably as close as historians will ever get to a definitive order from Hitler for the genocide carried out during the Holocaust.

In late 1942, German forces were defeated in the Second Battle of El Alamein, thwarting Hitler's plans to seize the Suez Canal and the Middle East. Overconfident in his own military expertise following the earlier victories in 1940, Hitler became distrustful of his Army High Command and began to interfere in military and tactical planning, with damaging consequences. In December 1942 and January 1943, Hitler's repeated refusal to allow their withdrawal at the Battle of Stalingrad led to the near-destruction of the 6th Army. Over 200,000 Axis soldiers were killed, and 235,000 were taken prisoner. Thereafter came a decisive strategic defeat at the Battle of Kursk. Hitler's military judgement became increasingly erratic, and Germany's military and economic position deteriorated, as did Hitler's health.

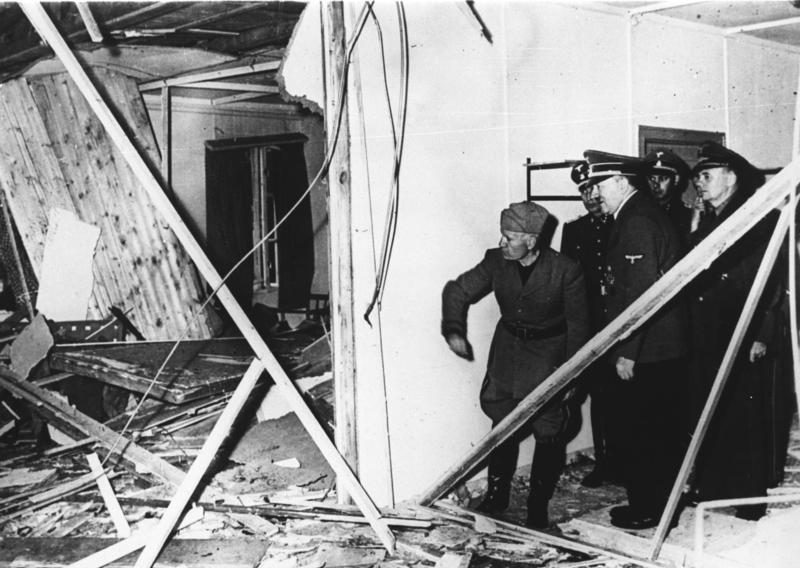
Hitler with Mussolini inspecting the damage at the Wolf's Lair after the 20 July plot

Following the Allied invasion of Sicily in 1943, Mussolini was removed from power by King Victor Emmanuel III after a vote of no confidence of the Grand Council of Fascism. Marshal Pietro Badoglio, placed in charge of the government, soon surrendered to the Allies. Throughout 1943 and 1944, the Soviet Union steadily forced Hitler's armies into retreat along the Eastern Front. On 6 June 1944, the Western Allied armies landed in northern France in one of the largest amphibious operations in history, Operation Overlord. Many German officers concluded that defeat was inevitable and that continuing under Hitler's leadership would result in the complete destruction of the country.

Between 1939 and 1945, there were numerous plans to assassinate Hitler, some of which proceeded to significant degrees. The most well-known and significant, the 20 July plot of 1944, came from within Germany and was at least partly driven by the increasing prospect of a German defeat in the war. Part of Operation Valkyrie, the plot involved Claus von Stauffenberg planting a bomb in one of Hitler's headquarters, the Wolf's Lair at Rastenburg. Hitler narrowly survived because the staff officer Heinz Brandt moved the briefcase containing the bomb behind a leg of the heavy conference table, which deflected much of the blast. Later, Hitler ordered reprisals, resulting in the execution of more than 4,900 people. Hitler was put on the United Nations War Crimes Commission's first list of war criminals in December 1944, after determining that Hitler could be held criminally responsible for the acts of the Nazis in occupied countries. By March 1945, at least seven indictments had been filed against him.

=== Defeat and death ===
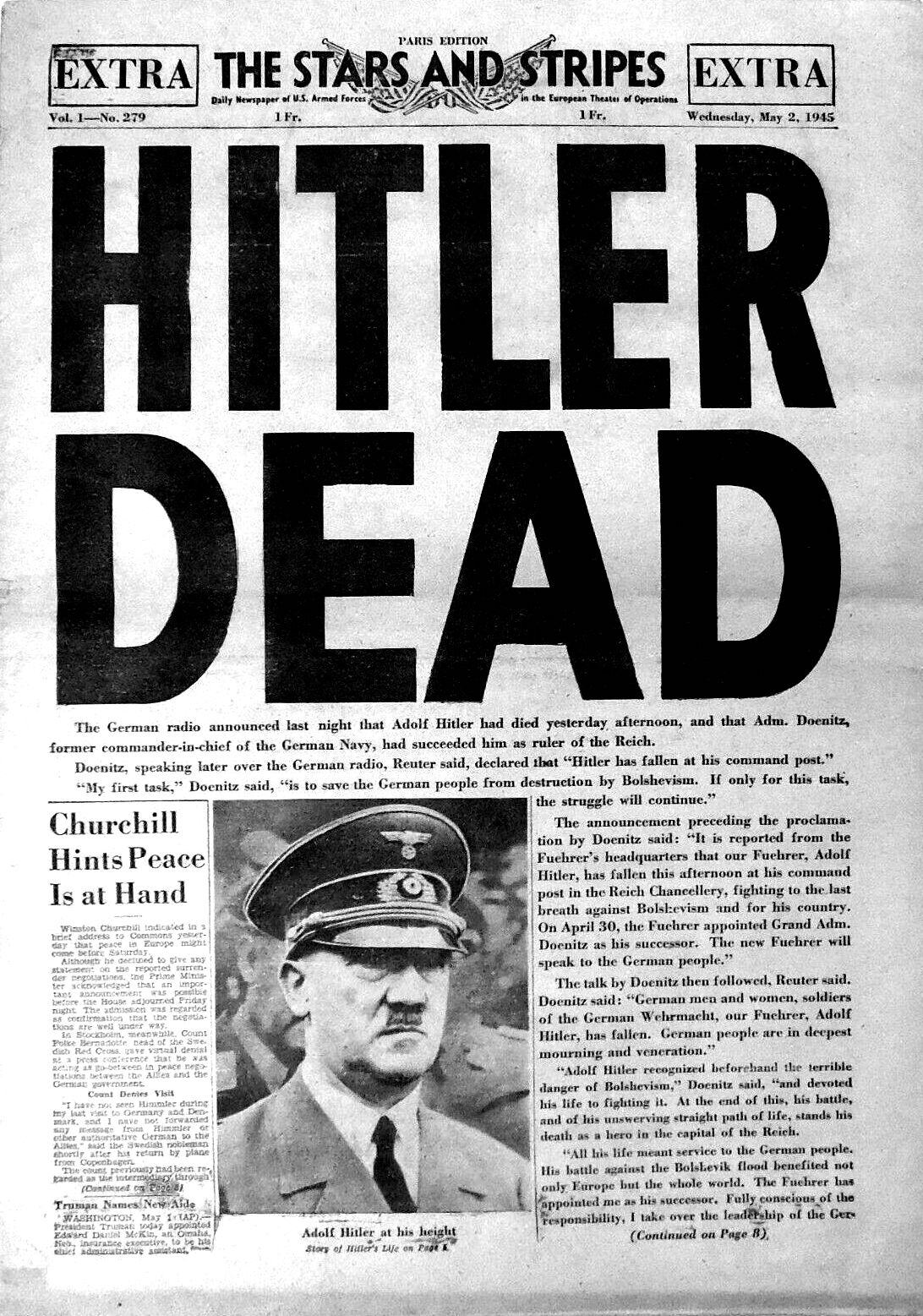
Front page of the US Armed Forces newspaper, Stars and Stripes, 2 May 1945, announcing Hitler's death. It erroneously states that Hitler died on 1 May; he died on 30 April.

By late 1944, both the Red Army and the Western Allies were advancing into Germany. Recognising the strength and determination of the Red Army, Hitler decided to use his remaining mobile reserves against the American and British armies, which he perceived as far weaker. On 16 December, he launched the Ardennes Offensive to incite disunity among the Western Allies and perhaps convince them to join his fight against the Soviets. After some temporary successes, the offensive failed. With much of Germany in ruins in January 1945, Hitler spoke on the radio: "However grave as the crisis may be at this moment, it will, despite everything, be mastered by our unalterable will." On 19 March, Hitler commented that the needs of the German population could now be disregarded, because they "had proven to be the weaker, and the future belongs solely to the stronger eastern nation. In any case only those who are inferior will remain after this struggle, for the good have already been killed". The same day, Hitler ordered the destruction of all German industrial infrastructure before it could fall into Allied hands. Minister for Armaments Albert Speer was entrusted with executing this scorched earth policy, but he secretly disobeyed the order. Hitler's hope to negotiate peace with the United States and Britain was encouraged by the death of US president Franklin D. Roosevelt on 12 April 1945, but contrary to his expectations, this caused no rift among the Allies.

On 20 April, his 56th birthday, Hitler made his last trip from the Führerbunker to the surface. In the ruined garden of the Reich Chancellery, he awarded Iron Crosses to boy soldiers of the Hitler Youth, who were now fighting the Red Army at the front near Berlin. By 21 April, Georgy Zhukov's 1st Belorussian Front had broken through the defences of General Gotthard Heinrici's Army Group Vistula during the Battle of the Seelow Heights and advanced to the outskirts of Berlin. In denial about the dire situation, Hitler placed his hopes on the undermanned and under-equipped Armeeabteilung Steiner (Army Detachment Steiner), commanded by Felix Steiner. Hitler ordered Steiner to attack the northern flank of the salient, while the German Ninth Army was ordered to attack northward in a pincer attack.

During a military conference on 22 April, Hitler enquired about Steiner's offensive. He was informed that the attack had not been launched and that the Soviets had entered Berlin. Hitler ordered everyone but Wilhelm Keitel, Alfred Jodl, Hans Krebs, and Wilhelm Burgdorf to leave the room, then launched into a tirade against the perceived treachery and incompetence of his generals, culminating in his declaration—for the first time—that "everything is lost". He announced that he would stay in Berlin until the end and then shoot himself.

By 23 April, the Red Army had surrounded Berlin, and Goebbels made a proclamation urging its citizens to defend the city. That same day, Göring sent a telegram from Berchtesgaden, arguing that as Hitler was isolated in Berlin, Göring should assume leadership of Germany. Göring set a deadline, after which he would consider Hitler incapacitated. Hitler responded by having Göring arrested, and in his last will and testament of 29 April, he removed Göring from all government positions. On 28 April, Hitler discovered that Himmler, who had left Berlin on 20 April, was attempting to negotiate a surrender to the Western Allies. He considered this treason and ordered Himmler's arrest. He also ordered the execution of Hermann Fegelein, Himmler's SS representative at Hitler's headquarters in Berlin, for desertion.

After midnight on the night of 28–29 April, Hitler married Eva Braun in a small civil ceremony in the Führerbunker. (Note: "Hitler's will and marriage" on the website of MI5, using the sources available to Hugh Trevor-Roper (a World War II MI5 agent and historian/author of The Last Days of Hitler), records the marriage as taking place after Hitler had dictated his last will and testament.MI5 n.d.) Later that afternoon, Hitler was informed that Mussolini had been executed by the Italian resistance movement on the previous day; this is believed to have increased his determination to avoid capture. On 30 April, Soviet troops were within five hundred metres of the Reich Chancellery when Hitler shot himself in the head and Braun bit into a cyanide capsule. In accordance with Hitler's wishes, their corpses were carried outside to the garden behind the Reich Chancellery, where they were placed in a bomb crater, doused with petrol, and set on fire as the Red Army shelling continued. Grand Admiral Karl Dönitz and Goebbels assumed Hitler's roles as head of state and chancellor respectively. On the evening of 1 May, Goebbels and his wife, Magda, committed suicide in the Reich Chancellery garden, after having poisoned their six children with cyanide.

Berlin surrendered on 2 May. The remains of the Goebbels family, General Hans Krebs (who had committed suicide that day), General Wilhelm Burgdorf, and Hitler's dog Blondi were repeatedly buried and exhumed by the Soviets. Hitler's and Braun's remains were alleged to have been moved as well, but this is most likely Soviet disinformation. There is no evidence that any identifiable remains of Hitler or Braun—with the exception of dental bridges—were ever found by them. While news of Hitler's death spread quickly, a death certificate was not issued until 1956, after a lengthy investigation to collect testimony from 42 witnesses. Hitler's death was entered as an assumption of death based on this testimony.

== The Holocaust ==
If the international Jewish financiers in and outside Europe should succeed in plunging the nations once more into a world war, then the result will not be the Bolshevisation of the earth, and thus the victory of Jewry, but the annihilation of the Jewish race in Europe!

— Adolf Hitler, 30 January 1939 Reichstag speech

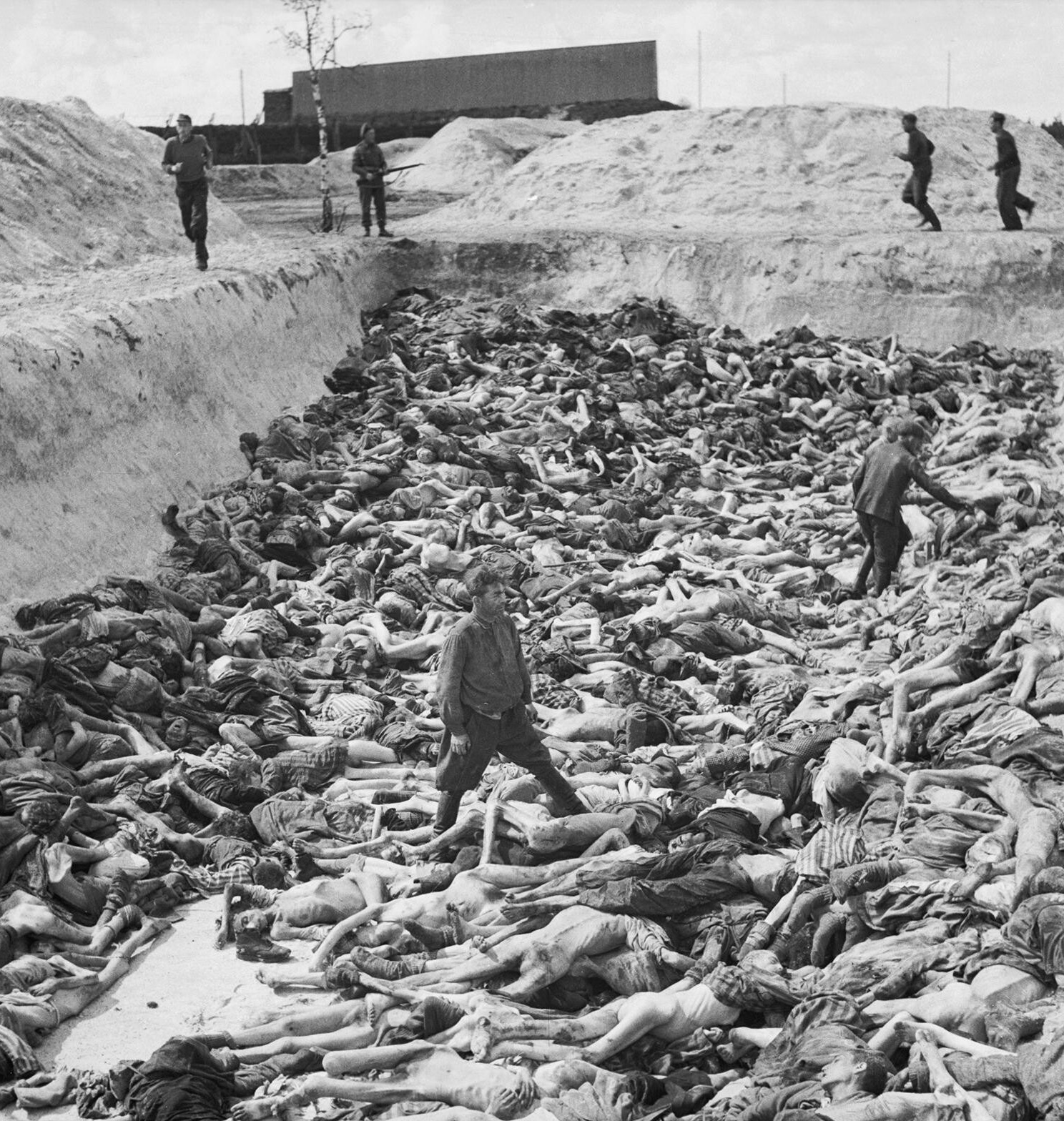
A mass grave at Bergen-Belsen after the camp's liberation, April 1945

The Holocaust and Germany's war in the East were based on Hitler's long-standing view that the Jews were the enemy of the German people, and that Lebensraum was needed for Germany's expansion. He focused on Eastern Europe for this expansion, aiming to defeat Poland and the Soviet Union and then removing or killing the Jews and Slavs. The Generalplan Ost (General Plan East) called for deporting the population of occupied Eastern Europe and the Soviet Union to West Siberia, for use as slave labour or to be murdered; the conquered territories were to be colonised by German or "Germanised" settlers. The goal was to implement this plan after the conquest of the Soviet Union, but when this failed, Hitler moved the plans forward. By January 1942, he had decided that the Jews, Slavs, and other deportees considered undesirable should be killed. (Note: For a summary of recent scholarship on Hitler's central role in the Holocaust, see McMillan (2012).)

The genocide was organised and executed by Heinrich Himmler and Reinhard Heydrich. The records of the Wannsee Conference, held on 20 January 1942 and led by Heydrich, with 15 senior Nazi officials participating, provide the clearest evidence of systematic planning for the Holocaust. On 22 February, Hitler was recorded saying, "we shall regain our health only by eliminating the Jews". Similarly, at a meeting in July 1941 with leading functionaries of the Eastern territories, Hitler said that the easiest way to quickly pacify the areas would be best achieved by "shooting everyone who even looks odd". Although no direct order from Hitler authorising the mass killings has surfaced, his public speeches and the diaries of Nazi officials demonstrate that he conceived and authorised the extermination of European Jewry. During the war, Hitler repeatedly stated his prophecy of 1939 was being fulfilled, namely, that a world war would bring about the annihilation of the Jewish race. Hitler approved the Einsatzgruppen—killing squads that followed the German army through Poland, the Baltic, and the Soviet Union—and was well informed about their activities. By summer 1942, Auschwitz concentration camp was expanded to accommodate large numbers of deportees for murder or enslavement. Scores of other concentration camps and satellite camps were set up throughout Europe, with several camps devoted exclusively to extermination.

Between 1939 and 1945, the Schutzstaffel (SS), assisted by collaborationist governments and recruits from occupied countries, were responsible for the deaths of at least 11 million non-combatants, including the murders of about six million Jews (representing two-thirds of the Jewish population of Europe), (Note: Evans (2008) states, "it has become clear that the probable total is around 6 million.") and between 200,000 and 1,500,000 Romani people. The victims were killed in concentration and extermination camps and in ghettos, and through mass shootings. Many victims of the Holocaust were murdered in gas chambers or shot, while others died of starvation or disease or while working as slave labourers. In addition to eliminating Jews, the Nazis planned to reduce the population of the conquered territories by 30 million people through starvation in an action called the Hunger Plan. Food supplies would be diverted to the German army and German civilians. Cities would be razed, and the land allowed to return to forest or resettled by German colonists. Together, the Hunger Plan and Generalplan Ost would have led to the starvation of 80 million people in the Soviet Union. These partially fulfilled plans resulted in additional deaths, bringing the total number of civilians and prisoners of war who died in the democide to an estimated 19.3 million people.

Hitler's policies resulted in the killing of nearly two million non-Jewish Polish civilians, over three million Soviet prisoners of war, communists and other political opponents, homosexuals, the physically and mentally disabled, Jehovah's Witnesses, Adventists, and trade unionists. Hitler never spoke publicly about the killings and seems to have never visited the concentration camps. The Nazis embraced the concept of racial hygiene. On 15 September 1935, Hitler presented two laws—known as the Nuremberg Laws—to the Reichstag. The laws banned sexual relations and marriages between Aryans and Jews and were later extended to include "Gypsies, Negroes or their bastard offspring". The laws stripped all non-Aryans of their German citizenship and forbade the employment of non-Jewish women under the age of 45 in Jewish households. Hitler's early eugenic policies targeted children with physical and developmental disabilities in a programme dubbed Action Brandt, and he later authorised a euthanasia programme for adults with serious mental and physical disabilities, now referred to as Aktion T4.

== Leadership style ==
Hitler ruled the Nazi Party autocratically by asserting the Führerprinzip (leader principle). The principle relied on absolute obedience of all subordinates to their superiors; thus, he viewed the government structure as a pyramid, with himself—the infallible leader—at the apex. Rank in the party was not determined by elections—positions were filled through appointment by those of higher rank, who demanded unquestioning obedience to the will of the leader. Hitler's leadership style was to give contradictory orders to his subordinates and to place them into positions where their duties and responsibilities overlapped with those of others, to have "the stronger one [do] the job". In this way, Hitler fostered distrust, competition, and infighting among his subordinates to consolidate and maximise his own power. His cabinet never met after 1938, and he discouraged his ministers from meeting independently. Hitler typically did not give written orders; instead, he communicated verbally, or had them conveyed through his close associate Martin Bormann. He entrusted Bormann with his paperwork, appointments, and personal finances; Bormann used his position to control the flow of information and access to Hitler.

Hitler dominated his country's war effort during World War II to a greater extent than any other national leader. He strengthened his control of the armed forces in 1938, and subsequently made all major decisions regarding Germany's military strategy. His decision to mount a risky series of offensives against Norway, France, and the Low Countries in 1940, against the advice of the military, proved successful, though the diplomatic and military strategies he employed in attempts to force the United Kingdom out of the war ended in failure. Hitler deepened his involvement in the war effort by appointing himself commander-in-chief of the Army in December 1941; from this point forward, he personally directed the war against the Soviet Union, while his military commanders facing the Western Allies retained a degree of autonomy. Hitler's leadership became increasingly disconnected from reality as the war turned against Germany, with the military's defensive strategies often hindered by his slow decision-making and frequent directives to hold untenable positions. Nevertheless, he continued to believe that only his leadership could deliver victory. In the final months of the war, Hitler refused to consider peace negotiations, regarding the destruction of Germany as preferable to surrender. The military did not challenge Hitler's dominance of the war effort, and senior officers generally supported and enacted his decisions.

== Personal life ==
=== Family ===
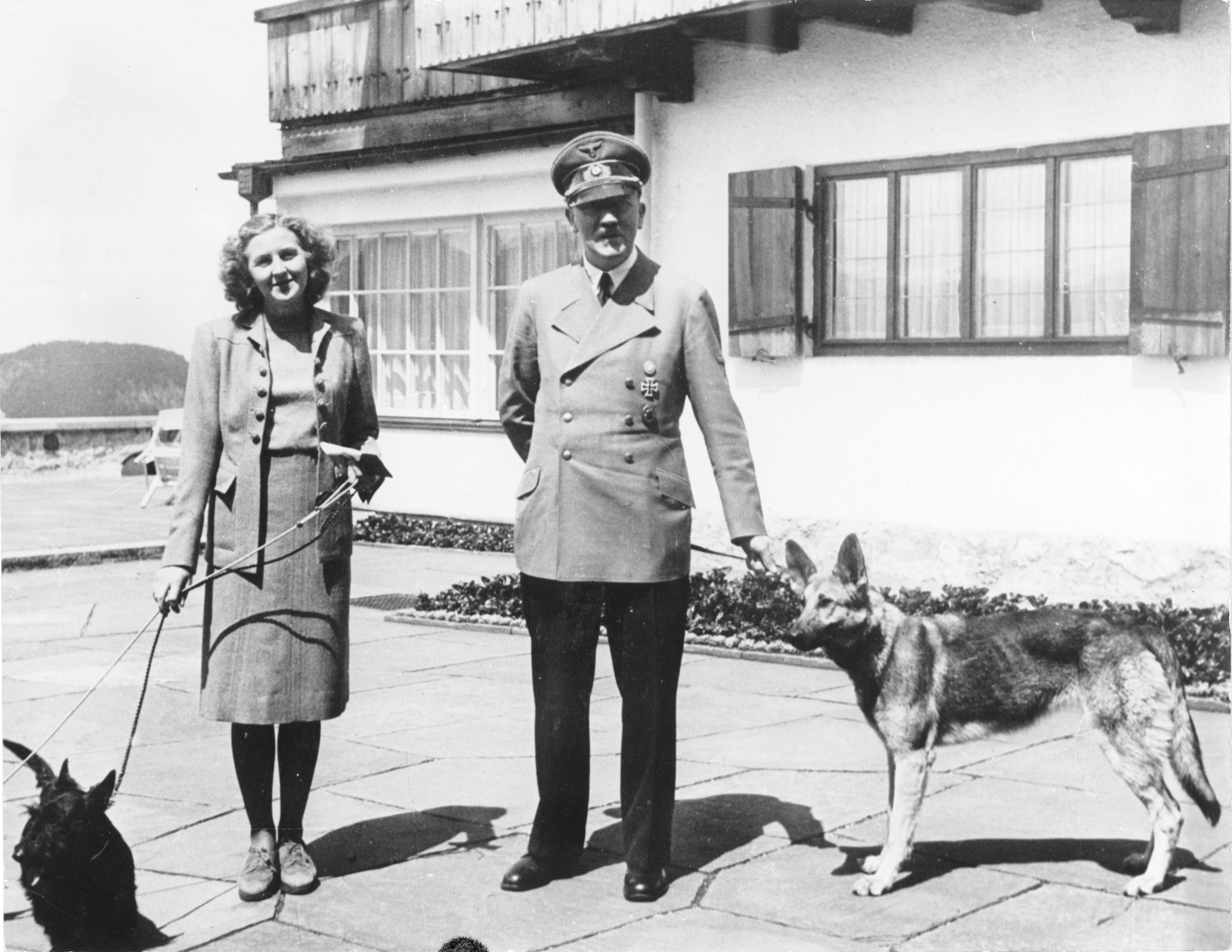
Hitler and Braun in 1942

Hitler created a public image as a celibate man without a domestic life, dedicated entirely to his political mission and the nation. He met his lover, Eva Braun, in 1929, and married her on 29 April 1945, one day before they both committed suicide. In September 1931, his half-niece, Geli Raubal, committed suicide with Hitler's gun in his Munich apartment. It was rumoured among contemporaries that Geli was in a romantic relationship with him, and her death was a source of deep, lasting pain. Paula Hitler, the younger sister of Hitler and the last living member of his immediate family, died in June 1960.

=== Views on religion ===
Hitler was born to a practising Catholic mother and an anti-clerical father; after leaving home, Hitler never again attended Mass or received the sacraments. Albert Speer stated that Hitler railed against the church to his political associates, and though he never officially left the church, he had no attachment to it. Speer added that Hitler felt that in the absence of organised religion, people would turn to mysticism, which he considered regressive. According to Speer, Hitler believed that Japanese religious beliefs or Islam would have been a more suitable religion for Germans than Christianity, with its "meekness and flabbiness". The historian John S. Conway states that Hitler was fundamentally opposed to the Christian churches. According to Bullock, Hitler did not believe in God, was anticlerical, and held Christian ethics in contempt because they contravened his preferred view of "survival of the fittest". He favoured aspects of Protestantism that suited his own views, and adopted some elements of the Catholic Church's hierarchical organisation, liturgy, and phraseology. In a 1932 speech, Hitler stated that he was not a Catholic, and declared himself a German Christian. According to Albert Speer, even after 1942 Hitler maintained the hope that "Through me the Evangelical Church could become the established church, as in England."

Hitler viewed the church as an important politically conservative influence on society, and he adopted a strategic relationship with it that "suited his immediate political purposes". In public, Hitler often praised Christian heritage and German Christian culture, though professing a belief in an "Aryan Jesus" who fought against the Jews. However, in Hitler’s Table Talk he was recorded as saying Christianity was an "absurdity" and nonsense founded on lies.

Shirer commented that "the Nazi regime intended to destroy Christianity in Germany, if it could, and substitute the old paganism of the early tribal Germanic gods with the new paganism of the Nazi extremists". According to Bullock, Hitler wanted to wait until after the war before executing this plan. Richard Steigmann-Gall has concluded there was no firm evidence of such a plan to replace Christianity. Swedish historian Mikael Nilsson notes that many of Hitler's religious statements are sourced from Table Talk, which he considers highly unreliable: much of the content was written days after the event and was heavily modified to suit the agendas of Martin Bormann and later François Genoud. Speer wrote that Hitler had a negative view of Himmler's and Alfred Rosenberg's mystical notions and Himmler's attempt to mythologise the SS. Hitler was more pragmatic, and his ambitions centred on more practical concerns.

=== Health ===
Researchers have variously suggested that Hitler suffered from irritable bowel syndrome, skin lesions, irregular heartbeat, coronary sclerosis, Parkinson's disease, syphilis, giant-cell arteritis, tinnitus, and monorchism.

In a report prepared for the OSS in 1943, Walter Charles Langer of Harvard University described Hitler as a "neurotic psychopath" and speculated that he exhibited masochistic tendencies and deep feelings of self-loathing, which he projected onto others, particularly Jews.

In his 1977 book The Psychopathic God: Adolf Hitler, the historian Robert G. L. Waite proposes that Hitler suffered from borderline personality disorder. The historians Henrik Eberle and Hans-Joachim Neumann consider that while he suffered from several illnesses, including Parkinson's disease, Hitler did not experience pathological delusions and was always fully aware of, and therefore responsible for, his decisions.

Sometime in the 1930s, Hitler adopted a mainly vegetarian diet, avoiding all meat and fish from 1942 onwards. At social events, he sometimes gave graphic accounts of the slaughter of animals in an effort to make his guests shun meat. Bormann had a greenhouse constructed near the Berghof (near Berchtesgaden) to ensure a steady supply of fresh fruit and vegetables for Hitler. Hitler stopped drinking alcohol around the time he became vegetarian and thereafter only very occasionally drank beer or wine on social occasions. He was a non-smoker for most of his adult life, but smoked heavily in his youth (25 to 40 cigarettes a day); he eventually quit, calling the habit "a waste of money". He encouraged his close associates to quit by offering a gold watch to anyone able to break the habit. Hitler began using amphetamine occasionally after 1937 and became addicted to it in late 1942. Speer linked this use of amphetamine to Hitler's increasingly erratic behaviour and inflexible decision-making (for example, rarely allowing military retreats).

Prescribed 90 medications during the war years by his personal physician, Theodor Morell, Hitler took many pills each day for chronic stomach problems and other ailments. He regularly consumed amphetamine, barbiturates, opiates, and cocaine, as well as potassium bromide and atropa belladonna (the latter in the form of Doktor Koster's Antigaspills). He suffered ruptured eardrums as a result of the 20 July plot bomb blast in 1944, and 200 wood splinters had to be removed from his legs. Newsreel footage of Hitler shows tremors in his left hand and a shuffling walk, which began before the war and worsened towards the end of his life. Ernst-Günther Schenck and several other doctors who met Hitler in the last weeks of his life also formed a diagnosis of Parkinson's disease.

== Legacy ==
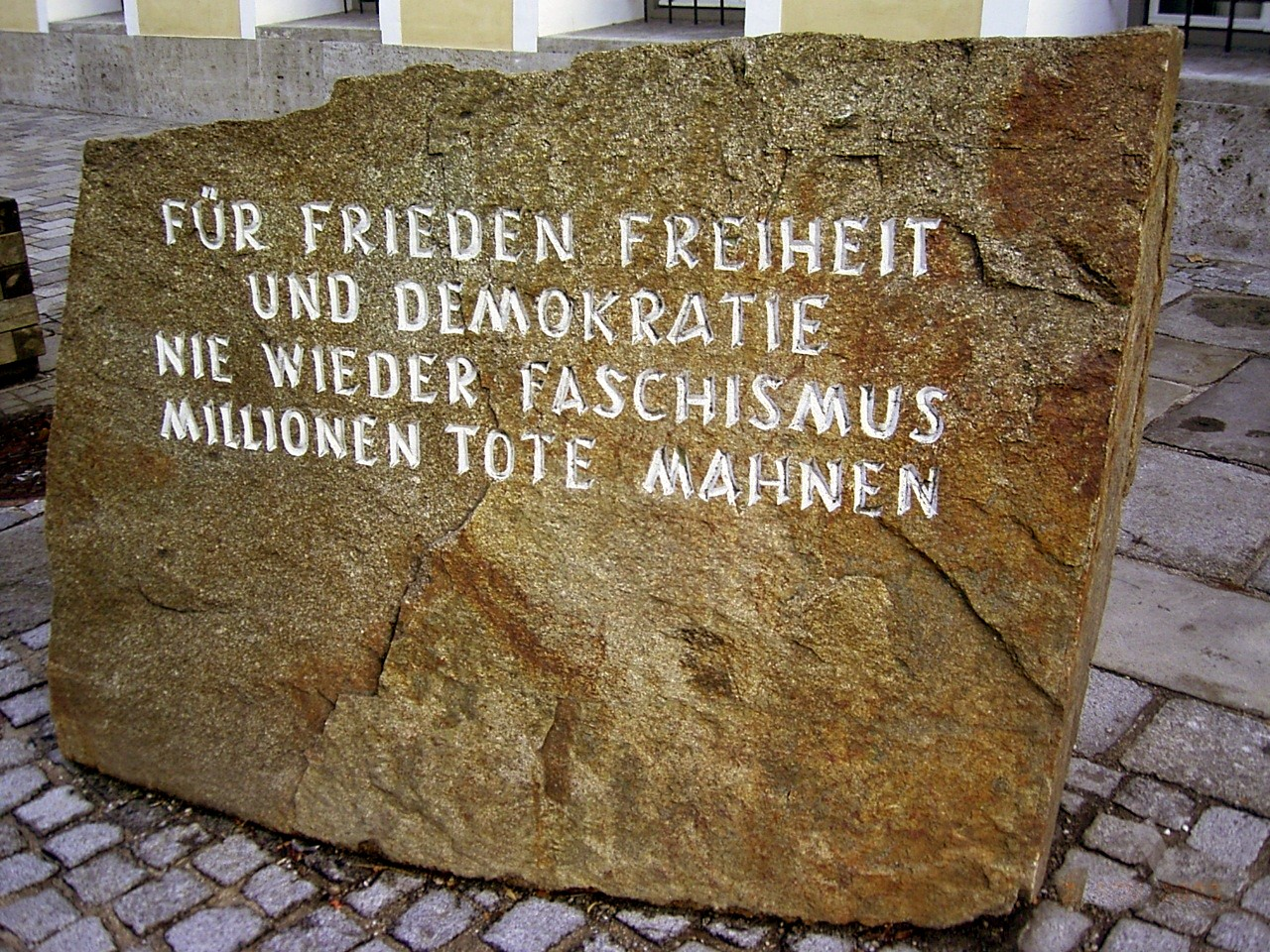
Outside of a building in Braunau am Inn, Austria, where Hitler was born, is a memorial stone placed as a reminder of World War II. The inscription translates as: For peace, freedom and democracy never again fascism millions of dead warn [us]

According to the historian Joachim Fest, Hitler's suicide was likened by numerous contemporaries to a "spell" being broken. Similarly, Speer commented in Inside the Third Reich on his emotions the day after Hitler's suicide: "Only now was the spell broken, the magic extinguished." Public support for Hitler had collapsed by the time of his death, which few Germans mourned; Kershaw argues that most civilians and military personnel were too busy adjusting to the collapse of the country or fleeing from the fighting to take any interest. According to the historian John Toland, Nazism "burst like a bubble" without its leader.

Kershaw describes Hitler as "the embodiment of modern political evil". "Never in history has such ruination—physical and moral—been associated with the name of one man", he adds. Hitler's political programme brought about a world war, leaving behind a devastated and impoverished Eastern and Central Europe. Germany suffered wholesale destruction, characterised as Stunde Null (Zero Hour). Hitler's policies inflicted human suffering on an unprecedented scale; according to R. J. Rummel, the Nazi regime was responsible for the democidal killing of an estimated 19.3 million civilians and prisoners of war. In addition, 28.7 million soldiers and civilians died as a result of military action in the European theatre of World War II. The number of civilians killed during the Second World War was unprecedented in the history of warfare. Historians, philosophers, and politicians often use the word "evil" to describe the Nazi regime. Many European countries have criminalised both the promotion of Nazism and Holocaust denial.

The historian Friedrich Meinecke described Hitler as "one of the great examples of the singular and incalculable power of personality in historical life". The English historian Hugh Trevor-Roper saw him as "among the 'terrible simplifiers' of history, the most systematic, the most historical, the most philosophical, and yet the coarsest, cruelest, least magnanimous conqueror the world has ever known". For the historian John M. Roberts, Hitler's defeat marked the end of a phase of European history dominated by Germany. In its place emerged the Cold War, a global confrontation between the Western Bloc, dominated by the United States and other NATO nations, and the Eastern Bloc, dominated by the Soviet Union. The historian Sebastian Haffner asserted that without Hitler and the displacement of the Jews, the modern nation-state of Israel would not exist. He contends that without Hitler, the de-colonisation of former European spheres of influence would have been postponed. Further, Haffner claimed that other than Alexander the Great, Hitler had a more significant impact than any other comparable historical figure, in that he too caused a wide range of worldwide changes in a relatively short time span.

=== In propaganda ===
Hitler exploited documentary films and newsreels to inspire a cult of personality. He was involved and appeared in a series of propaganda films throughout his political career, many made by Leni Riefenstahl, regarded as a pioneer of modern filmmaking. Hitler's propaganda film appearances include:

- Der Sieg des Glaubens (Victory of Faith, 1933)
- Triumph des Willens (Triumph of the Will, 1935)
- Tag der Freiheit: Unsere Wehrmacht (Day of Freedom: Our Armed Forces, 1935)
- Olympia (1938)

== See also ==
- Führermuseum – Unbuilt museum planned by Hitler for Linz, Austria
- Hitler and Mannerheim recording – 1942 recording of a conversation between Adolf Hitler and Gustaf Emil Mannerheim
- Julius Schaub – Chief aide
- Karl Mayr – Hitler's superior in army intelligence 1919–1920
- Karl Wilhelm Krause – Personal valet
- List of Adolf Hitler's personal staff
- List of streets named after Adolf Hitler
- Toothbrush moustache – Also known as a "Hitler moustache", a style of facial hair

== Bibliography ==
=== Printed ===
- Aigner, Dietrich (1985). "Hitler's ultimate aims – a programme of world dominion?". In Koch, H. W. (ed.). Aspects of the Third Reich. London: MacMillan. ISBN 978-0-312-05726-8.
- Doyle, D (February 2005). "Adolf Hitler's medical care". Journal of the Royal College of Physicians of Edinburgh. 35 (1): 75–82. doi:10.1177/1478271520053501020. PMID 15825245.
- Bauer, Yehuda (2000). Rethinking the Holocaust. New Haven: Yale University Press. p. 5. ISBN 978-0-300-08256-2.
- Beevor, Antony (2002). Berlin: The Downfall 1945. London: Viking-Penguin Books. ISBN 978-0-670-03041-5.
- Bendersky, Joseph W (2000). A History of Nazi Germany: 1919–1945. Lanham: Rowman & Littlefield. ISBN 978-1-4422-1003-5.
- Bloch, Michael (1992). Ribbentrop. New York: Crown Publishing. ISBN 978-0-517-59310-3.
- Bracher, Karl Dietrich (1970). The German Dictatorship. Translated by Jean Steinberg. New York: Penguin Books. ISBN 978-0-14-013724-8.
- Bullock, Alan (1962) [1952]. Hitler: A Study in Tyranny. London: Penguin Books. LCCN 63005065.
- Bullock, Alan (1999) [1952]. Hitler: A Study in Tyranny. New York: Konecky & Konecky. ISBN 978-1-56852-036-0.
- Butler, Ewan; Young, Gordon (1989). The Life and Death of Hermann Göring. Newton Abbot, Devon: David & Charles. ISBN 978-0-7153-9455-7.
- Bezymenski, Lev (1968). The Death of Adolf Hitler: Unknown Documents from Soviet Archives. New York: Harcourt, Brace & World. LCCN 68-29201.
- Carr, William (1972). Arms, Autarky and Aggression. London: Edward Arnold. ISBN 978-0-7131-5668-3.
- Conway, John S. (1968). The Nazi Persecution of the Churches 1933–45. London: Weidenfeld & Nicolson. ISBN 978-0-297-76315-4.
- Crandell, William F. (1987). "Eisenhower the Strategist: The Battle of the Bulge and the Censure of Joe McCarthy". Presidential Studies Quarterly. 17 (3): 487–501. JSTOR 27550441.
- Deighton, Len (2008). Fighter: The True Story of the Battle of Britain. New York: Random House. ISBN 978-1-84595-106-1.
- Del Testa, David W; Lemoine, Florence; Strickland, John (2003). Government Leaders, Military Rulers, and Political Activists. Westport: Greenwood Publishing Group. p. 83. ISBN 978-1-57356-153-2.
- Dollinger, Hans (1995) [1965]. The Decline and Fall of Nazi Germany and Imperial Japan: A Pictorial History of the Final Days of World War II. New York: Gramercy. ISBN 978-0-517-12399-7.
- Dorland, Michael (2009). Cadaverland: Inventing a Pathology of Catastrophe for Holocaust Survival: The Limits of Medical Knowledge and Memory in France. Tauber Institute for the Study of European Jewry series. Waltham, Mass: University Press of New England. ISBN 978-1-58465-784-2.
- Downing, David (2005). The Nazi Death Camps. World Almanac Library of the Holocaust. Pleasantville, NY: Gareth Stevens. ISBN 978-0-8368-5947-8.
- Ellis, John (1993). World War II Databook: The Essential Facts and Figures for All the Combatants. London: Aurum. ISBN 978-1-85410-254-6.
- Evans, Richard J. (2003). The Coming of the Third Reich. New York: Penguin Books. ISBN 978-0-14-303469-8.
- Evans, Richard J. (2005). The Third Reich in Power. New York: Penguin Books. ISBN 978-0-14-303790-3.
- Evans, Richard J. (2008). The Third Reich at War. New York: Penguin Books. ISBN 978-0-14-311671-4.
- Fest, Joachim C. (1970). The Face of the Third Reich. London: Weidenfeld & Nicolson. ISBN 978-0-297-17949-8.
- Fest, Joachim C. (1974) [1973]. Hitler. London: Weidenfeld & Nicolson. ISBN 978-0-297-76755-8.
- Fest, Joachim C. (1977) [1973]. Hitler. Harmondsworth: Penguin. ISBN 978-0-14-021983-8.
- Fest, Joachim C. (2004). Inside Hitler's Bunker: The Last Days of the Third Reich. New York: Farrar, Straus and Giroux. ISBN 978-0-374-13577-5.
- Fischer, Klaus P. (1995). Nazi Germany: A New History. London: Constable and Company. ISBN 978-0-09-474910-8.
- Fromm, Erich (1977) [1973]. The Anatomy of Human Destructiveness. London: Penguin Books. ISBN 978-0-14-004258-0.
- Fuchs, Thomas (2000). A Concise Biography of Adolf Hitler. New York: Berkley Books. ISBN 9780425173404.
- Gellately, Robert (1996). "Reviewed work(s): Vom Generalplan Ost zum Generalsiedlungsplan by Czeslaw Madajczyk. Der "Generalplan Ost". Hauptlinien der nationalsozialistischen Planungs- und Vernichtungspolitik by Mechtild Rössler; Sabine Schleiermacher". Central European History. 29 (2): 270–274. doi:10.1017/S0008938900013170. ISSN 0008-9389.
- Gellately, Robert (2001). Social Outsiders in Nazi Germany. Princeton, NJ: Princeton University Press. ISBN 978-0-691-08684-2.
- Ghaemi, Nassir (2011). A First-Rate Madness: Uncovering the Links Between Leadership and Mental Illness. New York: Penguin Publishing Group. ISBN 978-1-101-51759-8.
- Goeschel, Christian (2018). Mussolini and Hitler: The Forging of the Fascist Alliance. New Haven; London: Yale University Press. ISBN 978-0-300-17883-8.
- Goldhagen, Daniel (1996). Hitler's Willing Executioners: Ordinary Germans and the Holocaust. New York: Knopf. ISBN 978-0-679-44695-8.
- Haffner, Sebastian (1979). The Meaning of Hitler. Cambridge, MA: Harvard University Press. ISBN 978-0-674-55775-8.
- Hakim, Joy (1995). War, Peace, and All That Jazz. A History of US. Vol. 9. New York: Oxford University Press. ISBN 978-0-19-509514-2.
- Halperin, Samuel William (1965) [1946]. Germany Tried Democracy: A Political History of the Reich from 1918 to 1933. New York: W.W. Norton. ISBN 978-0-393-00280-5.
- Hamann, Brigitte (2010) [1999]. Hitler's Vienna: A Portrait of the Tyrant as a Young Man. Trans. Thomas Thornton. London; New York: Tauris Parke Paperbacks. ISBN 978-1-84885-277-8.
- Hancock, Ian (2004). "Romanies and the Holocaust: A Reevaluation and an Overview". In Stone, Dan (ed.). The Historiography of the Holocaust. New York; Basingstoke: Palgrave Macmillan. ISBN 978-0-333-99745-1.
- Heck, Alfons (2001) [1985]. A Child of Hitler: Germany in the Days When God Wore A Swastika. Phoenix, AZ: Renaissance House. ISBN 978-0-939650-44-6.
- Heston, Leonard L.; Heston, Renate (1980) [1979]. The Medical Casebook of Adolf Hitler: His Illnesses, Doctors, and Drugs. New York: Stein and Day. ISBN 978-0-8128-2718-7.
- Hett, Benjamin Carter (2014). Burning the Reichstag: An Investigation into the Third Reich's Enduring Mystery. Oxford: Oxford University Press.
- Hildebrand, Klaus (1973). The Foreign Policy of the Third Reich. London: Batsford. ISBN 978-0-7134-1126-3.
- Hitler, Adolf; Jäckel, Eberhard (1980). Hitler: sämtliche Aufzeichnungen, 1905–1924 (in German). Stuttgart: Deutsche Verlags-Anstalt. p. 1023. ISBN 978-3-421-01997-4.
- Hitler, Adolf (1999) [1925]. Mein Kampf. Trans. Ralph Manheim. Boston: Houghton Mifflin. ISBN 978-0-395-92503-4.
- Hitler, Adolf; Trevor-Roper, Hugh (1988) [1953]. Hitler's Table-Talk, 1941–1945: Hitler's Conversations Recorded by Martin Bormann. Oxford: Oxford University Press. ISBN 978-0-19-285180-2.
- Hitler, Adolf (2000) [1941–1944]. Hitler's Table Talk, 1941–1944. London: Enigma. ISBN 978-1-929631-05-6.
- Jetzinger, Franz (1976) [1956]. Hitler's Youth. Westport, Conn: Greenwood Press. ISBN 978-0-8371-8617-7.
- Joachimsthaler, Anton (1999) [1995]. The Last Days of Hitler: The Legends, the Evidence, the Truth. Trans. Helmut Bögler. London: Brockhampton Press. ISBN 978-1-86019-902-8.
- Kee, Robert (1988). Munich: The Eleventh Hour. London: Hamish Hamilton. ISBN 978-0-241-12537-3.
- Keegan, John (1987). The Mask of Command: A Study of Generalship. London: Pimlico. ISBN 978-0-7126-6526-1.
- Keller, Gustav (2010). Der Schüler Adolf Hitler: die Geschichte eines lebenslangen Amoklaufs [The Student Adolf Hitler: The Story of a Lifelong Rampage] (in German). Münster: LIT. ISBN 978-3-643-10948-4.
- Kellogg, Michael (2005). The Russian Roots of Nazism: White Émigrés and the Making of National Socialism, 1917–1945 (PDF). Cambridge: Cambridge University Press. ISBN 978-0-521-84512-0. Archived from the original (PDF) on 1 April 2025.
- Kershaw, Ian (1999) [1998]. Hitler: 1889–1936: Hubris. New York: W. W. Norton & Company. ISBN 978-0-393-04671-7.
- Kershaw, Ian (2000b). Hitler, 1936–1945: Nemesis. New York; London: W. W. Norton & Company. ISBN 978-0-393-32252-1.
- Kershaw, Ian (2008). Hitler: A Biography. New York City: W. W. Norton & Company. ISBN 978-0-393-06757-6. LCCN 2008037294. OCLC 1285564274. OL 22551194M. Wikidata Q138306767.
- Kershaw, Ian (2012). The End: Hitler's Germany, 1944–45 (Paperback ed.). London: Penguin. ISBN 978-0-14-101421-0.
- Koch, H. W. (June 1988). "Operation Barbarossa – The Current State of the Debate". The Historical Journal. 31 (2): 377–390. doi:10.1017/S0018246X00012930. S2CID 159848116.
- Kolb, Eberhard (2005) [1984]. The Weimar Republic. London; New York: Routledge. ISBN 978-0-415-34441-8.
- Kolb, Eberhard (1988) [1984]. The Weimar Republic. New York: Routledge. ISBN 978-0-415-09077-3.
- Kressel, Neil J. (2002). Mass Hate: The Global Rise of Genocide And Terror. Boulder: Basic Books. ISBN 978-0-8133-3951-1.
- Kubizek, August (2006) [1953]. The Young Hitler I Knew. St. Paul, MN: MBI. ISBN 978-1-85367-694-9.
- Kurowski, Franz (2005). The Brandenburger Commandos: Germany's Elite Warrior Spies in World War II. Stackpole Military History series. Mechanicsburg, PA: Stackpole Books. ISBN 978-0-8117-3250-5.
- Langer, Walter C. (1972) [1943]. The Mind of Adolf Hitler: The Secret Wartime Report. New York: Basic Books. ISBN 978-0-465-04620-1.
- Lichtheim, George (1974). Europe in the Twentieth Century. London: Sphere Books. ISBN 978-0-351-17192-5.
- Linge, Heinz (2009) [1980]. With Hitler to the End: The Memoirs of Adolf Hitler's Valet. Intro. Roger Moorhouse. New York: Skyhorse Publishing. ISBN 978-1-60239-804-7.
- Longerich, Peter (2005). The Unwritten Order: Hitler's Role in the Final Solution. History Press. ISBN 978-0-7524-3328-8.
- Maiolo, Joseph (1998). The Royal Navy and Nazi Germany 1933–39: Appeasement and the Origins of the Second World War. London: Macmillan Press. ISBN 978-0-333-72007-3.
- Manvell, Roger; Fraenkel, Heinrich (2007) [1965]. Heinrich Himmler: The Sinister Life of the Head of the SS and Gestapo. London; New York: Greenhill; Skyhorse. ISBN 978-1-60239-178-9.
- Maser, Werner (1973). Hitler: Legend, Myth, Reality. London: Allen Lane. ISBN 978-0-7139-0473-4.
- Marrus, Michael (2000). The Holocaust in History. Toronto: Key Porter. ISBN 978-0-299-23404-1.
- McGovern, James (1968). Martin Bormann. New York: William Morrow. OCLC 441132.
- McNab, Chris (2009). The Third Reich. London: Amber Books. ISBN 978-1-906626-51-8.
- Megargee, Geoffrey P. (2007). War of Annihilation: Combat and Genocide on the Eastern Front, 1941. Lanham, Md: Rowman & Littlefield. ISBN 978-0-7425-4482-6.
- Messerschmidt, Manfred (1990). "Foreign Policy and Preparation for War". In Deist, Wilhelm (ed.). Germany and the Second World War. Vol. 1. Oxford: Clarendon Press. ISBN 978-0-19-822866-0.
- Mitcham, Samuel W. (1996). Why Hitler?: The Genesis of the Nazi Reich. Westport, Conn: Praeger. ISBN 978-0-275-95485-7.
- Mineau, André (2004). Operation Barbarossa: Ideology and Ethics Against Human Dignity. Amsterdam; New York: Rodopi. ISBN 978-90-420-1633-0.
- Murray, Williamson (1984). The Change in the European Balance of Power. Princeton: Princeton University Press. ISBN 978-0-691-05413-1.
- Murray, Williamson; Millett, Allan R. (2001) [2000]. A War to be Won: Fighting the Second World War. Cambridge, MA: Belknap Press of Harvard University Press. ISBN 978-0-674-00680-5.
- Naimark, Norman M. (2002). Fires of Hatred: Ethnic Cleansing in Twentieth-Century Europe. Cambridge, MA: Harvard University Press. ISBN 978-0-674-00994-3.
- Nicholls, David (2000). Adolf Hitler: A Biographical Companion. University of North Carolina Press. ISBN 978-0-87436-965-6.
- Niewyk, Donald L.; Nicosia, Francis R. (2000). The Columbia Guide to the Holocaust. New York: Columbia University Press. ISBN 978-0-231-11200-0.
- Nilsson, Mikael (2020). Hitler Redux: The Incredible History of Hitler’s So-Called Table Talks. Abingdon, Oxon: Routledge. ISBN 978-1-000-17329-1.
- O'Donnell, James P. (2001) [1978]. The Bunker. New York: Da Capo Press. ISBN 978-0-306-80958-3.
- Oltermann, Philip (13 November 2025). "Did Hitler really have a 'micropenis'? The dubious documentary analysing the dictator's DNA". The Guardian.
- Overy, Richard; Wheatcroft, Andrew (1989). The Road To War. London: Macmillan. ISBN 978-0-14-028530-7.
- Overy, Richard (1999a). "Germany and the Munich Crisis: A Mutilated Victory?". In Lukes, Igor; Goldstein, Erik (eds.). The Munich Crisis, 1938: Prelude to World War II. London; Portland, OR: Frank Cass. OCLC 40862187.
- Overy, Richard (1999b). "Misjudging Hitler". In Martel, Gordon (ed.). The Origins of the Second World War Reconsidered. London: Routledge. ISBN 978-0-415-16324-8.
- Overy, Richard (2005). The Dictators: Hitler's Germany, Stalin's Russia. London: Penguin Books. ISBN 978-0-393-02030-4.
- Overy, Richard (2005). "Hitler As War Leader". In Dear, I. C. B.; Foot, M. R. D. (eds.). Oxford Companion to World War II. Oxford: Oxford University Press. ISBN 978-0-19-280670-3.
- Payne, Robert (1990) [1973]. The Life and Death of Adolf Hitler. New York: Hippocrene Books. ISBN 978-0-88029-402-7.
- Pearson, Drew; Allen, Robert S. (16 October 1941). "The Washington Merry-Go-Round: Ribbentrop Kept From Hitler Warning That U.S. Would Fight". San Francisco Chronicle. p. 15.
- Pinkus, Oscar (2005). The War Aims and Strategies of Adolf Hitler. McFarland & Company. ISBN 978-0-7864-2054-4.
- Plating, John D. (2011). The Hump: America's Strategy for Keeping China in World War II. Williams-Ford Texas A&M University military history series, no. 134. College Station: Texas A&M University Press. ISBN 978-1-60344-238-1.
- Plesch, Daniel (2017). Human Rights After Hitler: The Lost History of Prosecuting Axis War Crimes. Georgetown University Press. ISBN 978-1-62616-431-4.
- Proctor, Robert (1999). The Nazi War on Cancer. Princeton, New Jersey: Princeton University Press. ISBN 978-0-691-07051-3.
- Read, Anthony (2004). The Devil's Disciples: The Lives and Times of Hitler's Inner Circle. London: Pimlico. ISBN 978-0-7126-6416-5.
- Reck-Malleczewen, Friedrich (2013) [1947]. Diary of a Man in Despair. Translated by Rubens, Paul. New York Review of Books. ISBN 978-1-59017-586-6.
- Redlich, Fritz R. (2000). Hitler: Diagnosis of a Destructive Prophet. New York: Oxford University Press. ISBN 978-0-19-513631-9.
- Rees, Laurence (1997). The Nazis: A Warning from History. New York: New Press. ISBN 978-0-563-38704-6.
- Rißmann, Michael (2001). Hitlers Gott. Vorsehungsglaube und Sendungsbewußtsein des deutschen Diktators (in German). Zürich München: Pendo. ISBN 978-3-85842-421-1.
- Roberts, G. (2006). Stalin's Wars: From World War to Cold War, 1939–1953. New Haven: Yale University Press. ISBN 978-0-300-11204-7.
- Roberts, J. M. (1996). A History of Europe. Oxford: Helicon. ISBN 978-1-85986-178-3.
- Roberts, Martin (1975). The New Barbarism – A Portrait of Europe 1900–1973. London: Oxford University Press. ISBN 978-0-19-913225-6.
- Robertson, Esmonde M. (1963). Hitler's Pre-War Policy and Military Plans: 1933–1939. London: Longmans. OCLC 300011871.
- Robertson, E. M. (1985). "Hitler Planning for War and the Response of the Great Powers". In H. W., Koch (ed.). Aspects of the Third Reich. London: Macmillan. ISBN 978-0-312-05726-8.
- Rosenbaum, Ron (1999). Explaining Hitler: The Search for the Origins of His Evil. London: Harper Perennial. ISBN 978-0-06-095339-3.
- Rosmus, Anna Elisabeth (2004). Out of Passau: Leaving a City Hitler Called Home. Columbia, S.C: University of South Carolina Press. ISBN 978-1-57003-508-1.
- Rothwell, Victor (2001). The Origins of the Second World War. Manchester: Manchester University Press. ISBN 978-0-7190-5957-5.
- Rummel, Rudolph (1994). Death by Government. New Brunswick, NJ: Transaction. ISBN 978-1-56000-145-4.
- Ryschka, Birgit (2008). Constructing and Deconstructing National Identity: Dramatic Discourse in Tom Murphy's the Patriot Game and Felix Mitterer's in Der Löwengrube. Frankfurt am Main; New York: Peter Lang. ISBN 978-3-631-58111-7.
- Sereny, Gitta (1996) [1995]. Albert Speer: His Battle With Truth. New York; Toronto: Vintage. ISBN 978-0-679-76812-8.
- Shirer, William L. (1960). The Rise and Fall of the Third Reich: A History of Nazi Germany. New York City: Simon & Schuster. ASIN B0766DKDLR. LCCN 60006729. OCLC 1286630. OL 5794925M. Wikidata Q138029595.
- Snyder, Timothy (2010). Bloodlands: Europe Between Hitler and Stalin. New York: Basic Books. ISBN 978-0-465-00239-9.
- Speer, Albert (1971) [1969]. Inside the Third Reich. New York: Avon. ISBN 978-0-380-00071-5.
- Steigmann-Gall, Richard (2003). The Holy Reich: Nazi Conceptions of Christianity, 1919–1945. Cambridge; New York: Cambridge University Press. ISBN 978-0-521-82371-5.
- Steinberg, Jonathan (June 1995). "The Third Reich Reflected: German Civil Administration in the Occupied Soviet Union, 1941–4". The English Historical Review. 110 (437): 620–651. doi:10.1093/ehr/CX.437.620. OCLC 83655937.
- Steiner, John Michael (1976). Power Politics and Social Change in National Socialist Germany: A Process of Escalation into Mass Destruction. The Hague: Mouton. ISBN 978-90-279-7651-2.
- Stolfi, Russel (March 1982). "Barbarossa Revisited: A Critical Reappraisal of the Opening Stages of the Russo-German Campaign (June–December 1941)" (PDF). The Journal of Modern History. 54 (1): 27–46. doi:10.1086/244076. hdl:10945/44218. S2CID 143690841. Archived from the original (PDF) on 10 February 2020.
- Tames, Richard (2008). Dictatorship. Chicago: Heinemann Library. ISBN 978-1-4329-0234-6.
- Le Tissier, Tony (2010) [1999]. Race for the Reichstag. Barnsley: Pen & Sword. ISBN 978-1-84884-230-4.
- Toland, John (1976). Adolf Hitler. New York; Toronto: Ballantine Books. ISBN 978-0-345-25899-1.
- Toland, John (1992) [1976]. Adolf Hitler. New York: Anchor Books. ISBN 978-0-385-42053-2.
- Vinogradov, V. K. (2005). Hitler's Death: Russia's Last Great Secret from the Files of the KGB. London: Chaucer Press. ISBN 978-1-904449-13-3.
- Waite, Robert G. L. (1993) [1977]. The Psychopathic God: Adolf Hitler. New York: Da Capo Press. ISBN 978-0-306-80514-1.
- Weber, Thomas (2010). Hitler's First War: Adolf Hitler, The Men of the List Regiment, and the First World War. Oxford; New York: Oxford University Press. ISBN 978-0-19-923320-5.
- Weinberg, Gerhard (December 1964). "Hitler's Image of the United States". The American Historical Review. 69 (4): 1006–1021. doi:10.2307/1842933. JSTOR 1842933.
- Weinberg, Gerhard (1970). The Foreign Policy of Hitler's Germany Diplomatic Revolution in Europe 1933–1936. Chicago, Illinois: University of Chicago Press. ISBN 978-0-226-88509-4.
- Weinberg, Gerhard (1980). The Foreign Policy of Hitler's Germany Starting World War II. Chicago, Illinois: University of Chicago Press. ISBN 978-0-226-88511-7.
- Weinberg, Gerhard (1995). "Hitler and England, 1933–1945: Pretense and Reality". Germany, Hitler, and World War II: Essays in Modern German and World History. Cambridge: Cambridge University Press. ISBN 978-0-521-47407-8.
- Weinberg, Gerhard (2010) [2005]. Hitler's Foreign Policy 1933–1939: The Road to World War II. New York: Enigma. ISBN 978-1-929631-91-9.
- Weir, Todd H.; Greenberg, Udi (2022). "Religious Cultures and Confessional Politics". In Rossol, Nadine; Ziemann, Benjamin (eds.). The Oxford Handbook of the Weimar Republic. Oxford; New York: Oxford University Press. ISBN 978-0-19-884577-5.
- Welch, David (2001). Hitler: Profile of a Dictator. London: Routledge. ISBN 978-0-415-25075-7.
- Wheeler-Bennett, John (1967). The Nemesis of Power. London: Macmillan. ISBN 978-1-4039-1812-3.
- Wilt, Alan (December 1981). "Hitler's Late Summer Pause in 1941". Military Affairs. 45 (4): 187–191. doi:10.2307/1987464. JSTOR 1987464.
- Winkler, Heinrich August (2007). Germany: The Long Road West. Vol. 2, 1933–1990. Sager, Alexander (trans.). New York: Oxford University Press. ISBN 978-0-19-926598-5.
- Ziemke, Earl F. (1969). Battle for Berlin: End of the Third Reich. Ballantine's Illustrated History of World War II. Vol. Battle Book No. 6. London: Ballantine Books. OCLC 23899.

=== Online ===
- Apter, Simon Maxwell (20 July 2008). "'Hitler's Mufti,' Haj Amin al-Husseini". SFGATE. Archived from the original on 25 January 2021.
- Bazyler, Michael J. (25 December 2006). "Holocaust Denial Laws and Other Legislation Criminalizing Promotion of Nazism" (PDF). Yad Vashem. The World Holocaust Remembrance Center.
- "1933 – Day of Potsdam". City of Potsdam. December 2004. Archived from the original on 6 June 2012.
- "Nazism". Encyclopædia Britannica.
- Diver, Krysia (4 August 2005). "Journal reveals Hitler's dysfunctional family". The Guardian.
- "Documents: Bush's Grandfather Directed Bank Tied to Man Who Funded Hitler". Fox News. Associated Press. 17 October 2003. Archived from the original on 24 November 2014.
- Evans, Richard J. (22 June 2011). "Hitler's First War, by Thomas Weber". The Globe and Mail. Phillip Crawley.
- Frauenfeld, A. E (August 1937). "The Power of Speech". German Propaganda Archive. Calvin College.
- "Germany: Second Revolution?". Time. 2 July 1934. Archived from the original on 17 April 2008.
- Glantz, David (11 October 2001). "The Soviet-German War 1941–45: Myths and Realities: A Survey Essay". Clemson, SC: Strom Thurmond Institute of Government and Public Affairs, Clemson University. Archived from the original on 22 July 2017.
- Goebbels, Joseph (1936). The Führer as a Speaker. Calvin College.
- Gunkel, Christoph (4 February 2010). "Medicating a Madman: A Sober Look at Hitler's Health". Spiegel Online International.
- Hinrichs, Per (10 March 2007). "Des Führers Pass: Hitlers Einbürgerung" [The Führer's Passport: Hitler's Naturalisation]. Spiegel Online (in German).
- Hoffman, David (creator, writer) (1989). How Hitler Lost the War (television documentary). US: Varied Directions.
- Hunt, Katie (14 November 2025). "Researchers say they have verified and sequenced Hitler's DNA – and found a genetic disorder". CNN.
- "Introduction to the Holocaust". Holocaust Encyclopedia. United States Holocaust Memorial Museum. 20 September 2024.
- Jones, Bill (creator, director) (1989). The Fatal Attraction of Adolf Hitler (television documentary). England: BBC.
- "Leni Riefenstahl". The Daily Telegraph. London. 10 September 2003. ISSN 0307-1235. OCLC 49632006.
- Longerich, Heinz Peter (2003). "Hitler's Role in the Persecution of the Jews by the Nazi Regime". Holocaust Denial on Trial. Atlanta: Emory University. 15. Hitler and the Mass Shootings of Jews During the War Against Russia. Archived from the original on 22 July 2012.
- "Man of the Year". Time. 2 January 1939. Archived from the original on 18 April 2019.
- Martin, Jonathan (creator, writer) (2008). World War II in HD Colour (television documentary). US: World Media Rights. Archived from the original on 28 February 2015.
- McMillan, Dan (October 2012). "Review of Fritz, Stephen G., Ostkrieg: Hitler's War of Extermination in the East". H-Genocide, H-Net Reviews.
- "Hitler's Last Days". MI5. n.d.
- "Parkinson's part in Hitler's downfall". BBC News. 29 July 1999.
- Porat, Dina (21 October 2015). "Setting the Record Straight". Yad Vashem. Archived from the original on 11 August 2025.
- "Poles: Victims of the Nazi Era: The Invasion and Occupation of Poland". United States Holocaust Memorial Museum. n.d. Archived from the original on 3 March 2013.
- Redlich, Fritz C. (22 March 1993). "A New Medical Diagnosis of Adolf Hitler: Giant Cell Arteritis—Temporal Arteritis". Arch Intern Med. 153 (6): 693–697. doi:10.1001/archinte.1993.00410060005001. PMID 8447705.
- Rees, Laurence (writer, director) Kershaw, Ian (writer, consultant) (2012). The Dark Charisma of Adolf Hitler (television documentary). UK: BBC.
- Schröder, Kurt (2019) [1932]. "Eingabe der Industriellen an Hindenburg vom November 1932" [Letter of the industrialists to Hindenburg, November 1932]. Glasnost (in German). Berlin. "Gleichlautende Schreiben an den Reichspräsidenten schickten [...] (transl. Identical letters to the Reich President were sent by [...])."
- Staff (19 December 2015). "Hitler really did have only one testicle, German researcher claims". The Guardian.
- Weber, Thomas (2010a). "New Evidence Uncovers Hitler's Real First World War Story". BBC History Magazine. UK: Immediate Media Company. Archived from the original on 21 November 2012.
- Wilson, Bee (9 October 1998). "Mein Diat – Adolf Hitler's diet". New Statesman. UK. Archived from the original on 13 December 2013 – via Questia.
- Zialcita, Paolo (2019). "Hitler's Birth Home in Austria Will Become A Police Station". NPR.

Political offices
Preceded by Kurt von Schleicher	Chancellor of Germany^{(1)} 1933–1945	Succeeded by Joseph Goebbels
Preceded by Paul von Hindenburg as President	Führer of Germany^{(1)} 1934–1945	Succeeded by Karl Dönitz as President
Party political offices
Preceded by Anton Drexler as Chairman	Führer of the National Socialist German Workers' Party; 1921–1945	Succeeded by Martin Bormann as Party Minister
Preceded by Franz Pfeffer von Salomon	Supreme SA Leader; 1930–1945	Position abolished
Position established	Supreme Leader of the SS; 1934–1945	Position abolished
Military offices
Preceded by Paul von Hindenburg as Supreme Commander of the Reichswehr	Supreme Commander of the Wehrmacht; 1934–1945	Succeeded by Karl Dönitz
Preceded by Walther von Brauchitsch	Commander-in-Chief of the German Army; 1941–1945	Succeeded by Ferdinand Schörner
Honorary titles
Preceded by Chiang Kai-shek and Soong Mei-ling	Time Person of the Year; 1938	Succeeded by Joseph Stalin
Notes and references
1. The positions of Head of State and Government were combined 1934–1945 in the office of Führer and Chancellor of Germany
