= William Carr (historian) =

British historian

William Carr (1 April 1921 – 20 June 1991) was a British historian of Germany.

He was born in Workington, Cumberland. He studied history at the University of Birmingham, where he was awarded a prize for European history, but halted his studies after Germany's invasion of the Soviet Union. Carr volunteered and served in the Royal Corps of Signals and Royal Artillery. After victory, he worked as an interpreter of German internees before joining the Field Security Police. Carr returned to Birmingham University in 1947, where he was awarded a first class degree in 1948.

Carr was appointed lecturer in history at the University of Sheffield in 1952, then senior lecturer (1963), reader (1970) and then to a personal chair (1979). He retired in 1986. A few days before his death, Carr learnt that the German government had awarded him the Order of Merit of the Federal Republic of Germany.

== Works ==
- Schleswig-Holstein 1815-1848. A Study in National Conflict (Manchester University Press, 1963).
- The History of Germany, 1815-1945 (Edward Arnold, 1969; 2nd edn. 1979; 3rd edn. 1987; 4th edn. 1991).
- Arms, Autarky, and Aggression (Edward Arnold, 1970).
- Hitler: A Study in Personality and Politics (Edward Arnold, 1978).
- Poland to Pearl Harbor (Edward Arnold, 1985).
- The Origins of the Wars of German Unification (Longman, 1991).
