= Bibliography of Adolf Hitler =

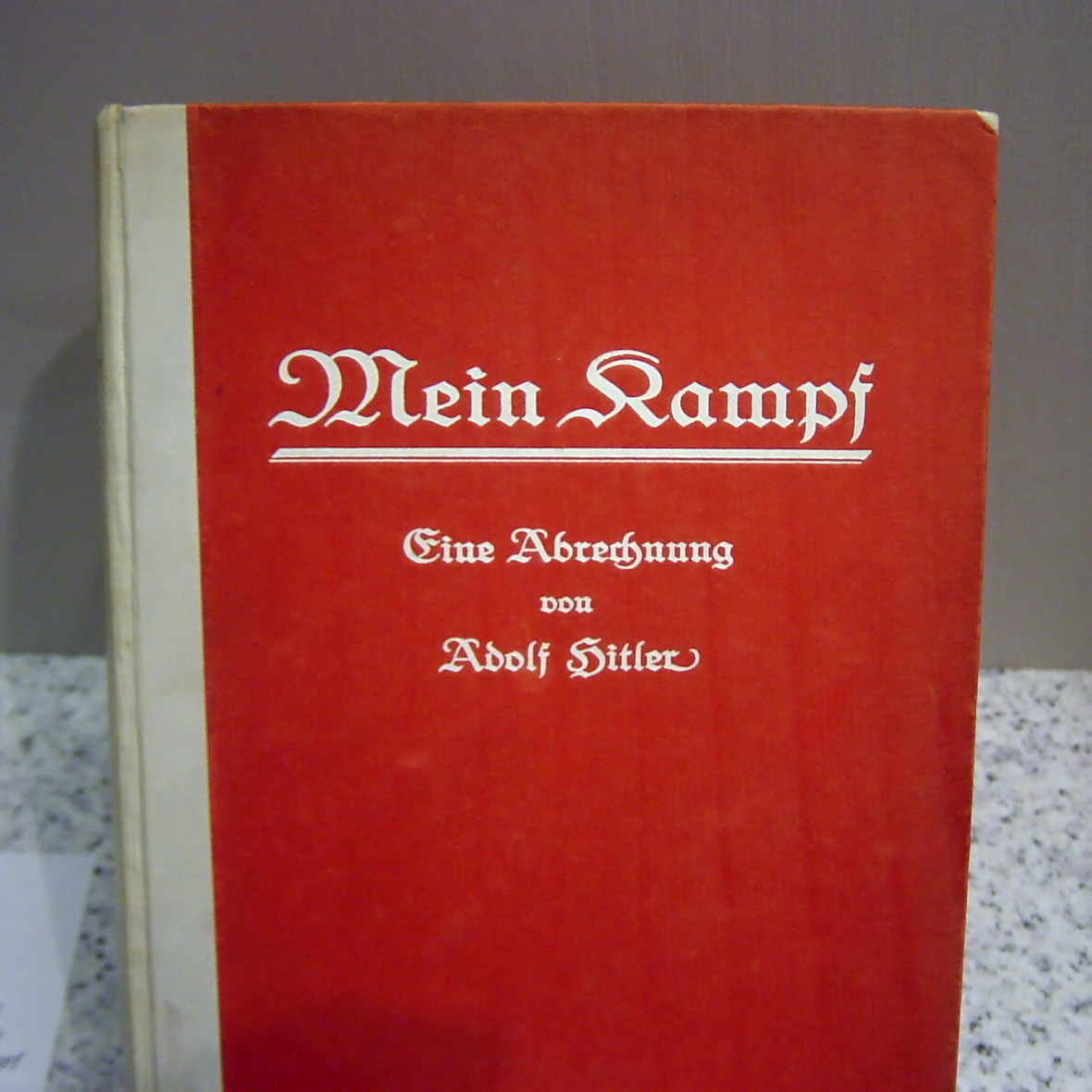
Mein Kampf, Hitler's first book

This bibliography of Adolf Hitler is a thematic list of some non-fiction texts in English written about/by him.

Thousands of books and other texts have been written about him, so this is far from an all-inclusive list: Writing in 2006, Ben Novak, an historian who specializes in Hitler studies, estimated that in 1975 there were more than 50,000 books and scholarly articles while these numbers rose to 120,000 in 1995, amounting to some 24 books and articles every day, adding that the "number is growing exponentially."

== Written by Adolf Hitler ==
- Hitler, A. (1925). Mein Kampf.
- Hitler, A. (1928). Zweites Buch (trans.) Hitler's Second Book: The Unpublished Sequel to Mein Kampf by Adolf Hitler. (Enigma Books: New York, 2006. ISBN 978-1-929631-61-2)
- Hitler, A. (1945). My Political Testament. Wikisource Version
- Hitler, A. (1945). My Private Will and Testament. Wikisource Version

== Co-written by Hitler or containing words by Hitler ==
- Hitler, A. (1924). Der Hitler-Prozeß vor dem Volksgericht in München [The Hitler Trial Before the People's Court in Munich]. OCLC 638670803.
- Hitler, A., et al. (1971). Unmasked: Two Confidential Interviews with Hitler in 1931. Chatto & Windus. ISBN 0-7011-1642-0
- Hitler, A., et al. (1974). Hitler's Letters and Notes. Harper & Row. ISBN 0-06-012832-1
- Hitler, A., et al. (2000). Hitler's Table Talk Enigma Books. ISBN 978-1-929631-66-7
- Hitler, A. (1964). Hitler's War Directives, 1939–45. Sidgwick and Jackson. ASIN B0006DFG5K

== Hitler's speeches ==
- Baynes, N. (1942). The Speeches of Adolf Hitler, April 1922 – August 1939 V1. London, Oxford University Press. ISBN 0-598-75893-3
- Baynes, N. (1942). The Speeches of Adolf Hitler, April 1922 – August 1939 V2. London: Oxford University Press. ISBN 0-598-75894-1
- Domarus, Max (1990). Hitler: Speeches and Proclamations 1932–1945 – The Chronicle of a Dictatorship (4 vols.) Bolchazy-Carducci Publishers, Inc. ISBN 0-86516-227-1
- Domarus, M., Romane, P., ed. (2007). The Essential Hitler: Speeches and Commentary. ISBN 0-86516-665-X
- Domarus, M. (2007). The Complete Hitler: A Digital Desktop Reference to His Speeches & Proclamations 1932–1945. ISBN 0-86516-658-7
- Levyatan, Yaniv. "Harold D. Lasswell's analysis of Hitler's speeches." Media History 15.1 (2009): 55-69. online
- Miguel, M. (2004). Hitler: Speeches and Proclamations 1941–1945 V4. Miguel Melo Phipps Publishers, Inc. ISBN 0-86516-231-X
- Prange, Gordon W. (1944). Hitler's Words: Two Decades of National Socialism, 1923–1942. American Council on Public Affairs. ASIN B0007EKRAW
- Roussy de Sales, Raoul de. (1973) [1941]. My New Order: A collection of Hitler's Speeches. Octagon Books. ISBN 0-374-93918-7

== Biographies of Hitler ==
- Bullock, Alan (1971, Abridged) [1952]. Hitler: A Study in Tyranny. Bantam Books. ISBN 1-56852-036-0
- Cross, Colin (1973). Adolf Hitler. Hodder and Stoughton. ISBN 0-340-10911-4
- Davidson, Eugene (1977). The Making of Adolf Hitler. Macmillan Pub. Co. ISBN 0-8262-1117-8
- Davidson, Eugene (1996). Unmaking of Adolf Hitler. Univ. of Missouri Pr. ISBN 0-8262-1045-7
- Eberle, Henrik & Uhl, Matthias (2005). The Hitler Book: The Secret Dossier Prepared for Stalin from the Interrogations of Hitler's Personal Aides. New York: Public Affairs. ISBN 978-1-58648-366-1
- Fest, Joachim (2002) [1974]. Hitler. Harvest Books. ISBN 0-15-602754-2
- Fuchs, Thomas (2000). A Concise Biography of Adolf Hitler. Berkley. ISBN 0-425-17340-2
- Giblin, James (2002). The Life and Death of Adolf Hitler. Clarion Books. ISBN 0-395-90371-8
- Gogerly, Liz (2003). Adolf Hitler. Heinemann/Raintree. ISBN 0-7398-5256-6
- Hant, Claus (2010). Young Hitler. London: Quartet Books. ISBN 978-0-7043-7182-8.
- Heiden, Konrad (1944). Der Fuehrer: Hitler's Rise to Power. Beacon Press. ISBN 0-8070-5665-0
- Heiden, Konrad (1936). Hitler: A Biography. A.A. Knopf.
- Heyes, Eileen (1994). Adolf Hitler. Millbrook Pr. ISBN 1-56294-343-X
- Housden, Martyn (2000). Hitler: Study of a Revolutionary?. Routledge. ISBN 0-415-16358-7
- Kershaw, Ian (1999). Hitler: 1889–1936: Hubris. New York: W. W. Norton & Company. ISBN 978-0-393-04671-7.
- Kershaw, Ian (2000). Hitler, 1936–1945: Nemesis. New York; London: W. W. Norton & Company. ISBN 978-0-393-04994-7.
- Kershaw, Ian (2008). Hitler: A Biography. New York: W. W. Norton & Company. ISBN 978-0-393-06757-6.
- Longerich, Peter (2019). Hitler: A Life. New York: Oxford University Press. ISBN 978-0-19-005673-5.
- Marrin, Albert (1987). Hitler. Penguin Books ISBN 0-670-81546-2
- Maser, Werner (1973). Hitler: Legend, Myth & Reality. Harper & Row. ISBN 0-06-012831-3
- Payne, Robert (1973). The Life and Death of Adolf Hitler. Cape. ISBN 0-224-00927-3
- Price, Billy F. (1984). Adolf Hitler: The Unknown Artist. Stephen Cook. ISBN 0-9612894-0-6
- Range, Peter Ross. (2020). The Unfathomable Ascent: How Hitler Came to Power. Little, Brown and Company. ASIN: B07H2DCN1B
- Shirer, William (1961). The Rise and Fall of Adolf Hitler. Scholastic. ISBN 0-394-86270-8
- Simms, Brendan (2019). Hitler: A Global Biography. Allen Lane. ISBN 1-84614-247-4
- Smith, Bradley F. (1967). Adolf Hitler: His Family, Childhood, and Youth. Hoover Institution Press. ISBN 0-8179-1622-9
- Stalcup, Brenda (2000). Adolf Hitler. Greenhaven Pr. ISBN 0-7377-0222-2
- Stern, J. P. (1992) [1975]. Hitler: The Führer and the People. Berkeley and Los Angeles: University of California Press, 1992. ISBN 0-520-02952-6
- Tames, Richard (1998). Adolf Hitler: An Unauthorized Biography. Heinemann Library. ISBN 1-57572-689-0
- Toland, John (1976). Adolf Hitler. Doubleday. ISBN 0-385-03724-4
- Ullrich, Volker (2016). Hitler: Volume I: Ascent (1889–1939). The Bodley Head Ltd. ISBN 1-84792-285-6
- Ullrich, Volker (2020). Hitler: Volume II: Downfall (1939–45). The Bodley Head Ltd. ISBN 978-1-84792-287-8
- Weber, Thomas (2017) Becoming Hitler: The Making of a Nazi. New York: Basic Books. ISBN 978-0-465-03268-6
- Wepman, Dennis (1989). Adolf Hitler. Chelsea House Pub. ISBN 0-7910-0575-5
- Williams, John F. (2005). Corporal Hitler and the Great War 1914–1918: The List Regiment. Frank Cass. ISBN 0-415-35855-8
- Wilson, A. N. (2012). Hitler: A Short Biography. Basic Books. ISBN 978-0-465-03128-3

== Illustrations of Hitler ==
- Cigaretten Bilderdienst (1979) [1936]. Adolf Hitler: Pictures of the Life of the Fuhrer. Northstar Commemoratives. ISBN 0-910667-04-7
- Blundell, Nigel (1995). Pictorial History of Adolf Hitler. World Pubns. ISBN 1-57215-137-4
- Hoffmann, Heinrich (1937). Hitler off Duty. ASIN B003W3GDE4
- Hoffmann, Heinrich (1939). The Face of the Fuhrer. ISBN 978-1-899765-90-4
- Hoffmann, Heinrich (1939). With Hitler in Poland. ASIN B00CK1ORKG
- Hoffmann, Heinrich (2015). With Hitler in the West. Pen & Sword. ISBN 978-1-4738-3352-4
- Hook, Alex (2004). Illustrated History of the Third Reich. TAJ Books. ISBN 978-1-84406-030-6
- Kelly, Maurice E. (1990). Adolf Hitler. Olympic Marketing Corp. ISBN 0-908240-88-0
- Lang, Jochen (1973). Hitler Close-Up: Hitler in Words and Pictures Macmillan. ISBN 978-0-671-06962-9
- Lorant, Stefan (1979). Sieg Heil: An illustrated history of Germany from Bismarck to Hitler. Bonanza Books. ISBN 0-517-27787-5
- Matanle, Ivor (1983). Adolf Hitler: A Photographic Documentary. Crescent Books, New York. ASIN B000GOW0PI
- Toland, John (1978). Hitler: The Pictorial Documentary of His Life Doubleday. ISBN 978-0-385-04546-9

== Medical studies of Hitler ==
- Binion, Rudolph (1976). Hitler Among the Germans. Northern Illinois University Press. ISBN 978-0-87580-531-3
- Doyle, D. (2005). "Adolf Hitler's Medical Care" (PDF). Journal of the Royal College of Physicians of Edinburgh. 35 (1): 75–82. doi:10.1177/1478271520053501020. PMID 15825245. Archived (PDF) from the original on 25 October 2017.
- Eberle, Henrik & Neumann, Hans-Joachim (2012). Was Hitler ILL?: A Final Diagnosis. Polity. ISBN 0-7456-5222-0
- Heston, Leonard L. (1980). The Medical Casebook of Adolf Hitler: His Illnesses, Doctors, and Drugs. Stein & Day Pub. ISBN 0-8128-2718-X
- Langer, Walter C. (1972).The Mind of Adolf Hitler: The Secret Wartime Report. Basic Books. ISBN 0-465-04620-7
- Lewis, David (2004). The Man Who Invented Hitler: The Making of the Fuhrer (sic). Headline Book Publishing. ISBN 0-7553-1149-3
- Murray, Henry A. (1943). Analysis of the Personality of Adolph Hitler: With Predictions of His Future Behavior and Suggestions for Dealing with Him Now and After Germany's Surrender.
- Rosenbaum, Ron (1999). Explaining Hitler: The Search for the Origins of His Evil. Harper Perennial. ISBN 0-06-095339-X
- Rudolph, Christin-Désirée (2016). Das Leck der Hitler-Thesen: Eine Psychopathographie. Rheine: Rudolph. ISBN 978-3-00-053332-7.
- Schwaab, Edleff H. (1992). Hitler's Mind: A Plunge into Madness. New York: Praeger. ISBN 0-275-94132-9.
- Victor, George (1999). Hitler: The Pathology of Evil. Potomac Books. ISBN 1-57488-228-7
- Waite, Robert (1993) [1977]. The Psychopathic God: Adolf Hitler. Da Capo Press. ISBN 0-306-80514-6
- Zalampas, Sherree O. (1990). Adolf Hitler: A Psychological Interpretation of His Views on Architecture, Art, and Music. Bowling Green, Ohio: Bowling Green University Popular Press. ISBN 0-87972-488-9.

== Directly related to Hitler ==
- Anderson, Ken (1995). Hitler and the Occult. Prometheus Books. ISBN 0-87975-973-9
- Berry, Rynn (2004). Hitler: Neither Vegetarian Nor Animal Lover. Pythagorean Books. ISBN 0-9626169-6-6
- Boldt, Gerhard (1973). Hitler's Last Ten Days: An Eye-Witness Account. ISBN 1-84415-361-4. Translated by Sandra Bance.
- Bullock, Alan (1991). Hitler and Stalin: Parallel Lives. HarperCollins. ISBN 0-679-72994-1
- Carr, William (1978). Hitler: A Study in Personality and Politics. Edward Arnold. ISBN 978-0-7131-6141-0
- Cornish, Kimberley (1998). The Jew of Linz: Wittgenstein, Hitler, and Their Secret Battle for the Mind. London: Century. ISBN 0-7126-7935-9.
- Corvaja, Santi (2001). Hitler and Mussolini: The Secret Meetings. Enigma Books. ISBN 978-1-929631-42-1
- Dupuy, Trevor N. (1969). Military Life of Adolf Hitler, Führer of Germany. F. Watts. ISBN 0-531-01873-3
- Evans, Richard J. (1989). In Hitler's Shadow: West German Historians and the Attempt to Escape from the Nazi Past. Pantheon. ISBN 978-0-394-57686-2
- Evans, Richard J. (2001). Lying About Hitler: History, Holocaust, and the David Irving Trial. Basic Books. ISBN 0-465-02152-2
- Haffner, Sebastian (1983). The Meaning of Hitler Harvard University Press. ISBN 0-674-55775-1
- Heiber, Helmut; Glantz, David M., eds. (2002). Hitler and His Generals: Military Conferences 1942–1945: The First Complete Stenographic Record of the Military Situation Conferences, from Stalingrad to Berlin. London: Greenhill. ISBN 978-1-85367-524-9.
- Hamann, Brigitte (2000). Hitler's Vienna. Oxford University Press. ISBN 0-19-514053-2
- Jäckel, Eberhard (2000) [1969]. Hitler's World View: A Blueprint for Power. Oxford University Press. ISBN 0-674-40425-4
- Joachimsthaler, Anton (1999) [1995]. The Last Days of Hitler: Legend, Evidence and Truth. Brockhampton Press. ISBN 1-86019-902-X
- Kershaw, Ian (1987) The 'Hitler Myth': Image and Reality in the Third Reich. Oxford University Press. ISBN 0-19-282234-9
- Knopp, Guido (2004). Hitler's Children. Sutton Publishing. ISBN 978-0-7509-3780-1
- Knopp, Guido (1998). Hitler's Henchmen. Sutton Publishing. ISBN 0-7509-3781-5
- Lively, Scott (1995). The Pink Swastika. Online Version Veritas Aeterna Press. ISBN 0-9647609-7-5
- Lukacs, John (1998). The Hitler of History. Vintage. ISBN 0-375-70113-3
- Lee, Stephen J. (1998). Hitler and Nazi Germany. Routledge. ISBN 0-415-17988-2
- Machtan, Lothar (2001). The Hidden Hitler Hitler. Basic Book. ISBN 0-465-04308-9
- McDonough, Frank (2003). Hitler and the Rise of the Nazi Party. Longman. ISBN 0-582-50606-9
- Mitcham, Samuel W., Jr. (1996). Why Hitler?: The Genesis of the Third Reich. Westport, Connecticut: Praeger. ISBN 0-275-95485-4
- Moorhouse, Roger (2006). Killing Hitler. Cape. ISBN 0-224-07121-1
- Novak, Ben (2014). Hitler and Abductive Logic: The Strategy of a Tyrant. Lexington Books. ISBN 978-0-7391-9224-5
- Petrova, Ada (1995). The Death of Hitler: The Full Story With New Evidence from Secret Russian Archives. W. W. Norton & Co Inc. ISBN 0-393-03914-5
- Pietrusza, David (2015), 1932: The Rise of Hitler and FDR--Two Tales of Politics, Betrayal, and Unlikely Destiny. Lyons Press.
- Rees, Laurence (2012). The Dark Charisma of Adolf Hitler: Leading Millions into the Abyss. Ebury Publishing. ISBN 978-0-09-191765-4
- Rich, Norman (1992). Hitler's War Aims: Ideology, the Nazi State, and the Course of Expansion. W. W. Norton & Company. ISBN 0-393-00802-9
- Roberts, Stephen (1938). The House That Hitler Built. Harper & Brothers.
- Rosenfeld, Alvin (1985) Imagining Hitler Indiana University Press. ISBN 0-253-13960-0
- Ryback, Timothy W. (2008). Hitler's Private Library: The Books that Shaped his Life Alfred A. Knopf. ASIN B001J1S894
- Sayer, Ian (2004). The Women Who Knew Hitler: The Private Life of Adolf Hitler. Carroll & Graf. ISBN 0-7867-1402-6
- Schramm, Percy Ernst (1971). Hitler: The Man and the Military Leader Quadrangle Books. ASIN B00LDYD3YM
- Snyder, Louis (1961). Hitler and Nazism. Franklin Watts Inc. ISBN 1-121-67474-7
- Spielvogel, Jackson J. (2004). Hitler and Nazi Germany: A History. Prentice Hall. ISBN 0-13-189877-9
- Spotts, Frederic (2004) [2002]. Hitler and the Power of Aesthetics. Overlook Press. ISBN 1-58567-345-5
- Stackelberg, Roderick (1999). Hitler's Germany. Routledge. ISBN 0-415-20114-4
- Stratigakos, Despina (2015). Hitler at Home. Yale University Press – analyzing his homes in Berlin, Munich, and Obersalzberg
- Strawson, John (2003) [1971]. Hitler as Military Commander. Barnsley: Pen & Sword. ISBN 0-85052-956-5.
- Trevor-Roper, H. (1992) [1947]. The Last Days of Hitler. University Of Chicago Press. ISBN 0-226-81224-3
- Turner, Henry Ashby (1996). Hitler's Thirty Days to Power. Addison-Wesley. ISBN 978-0-201-40714-3.
- Weinberg, Gerhard L. (2010). Hitler's Foreign Policy, 1933–1939: The Road to World War II. Enigma Books. ISBN 978-1-929631-91-9
- Welch, David (2001). Hitler: Profile of a Dictator. Routledge. ISBN 0-415-25075-7
- Wiskemann, Elizabeth (1949). The Rome-Berlin Axis: A History of the Relations between Hitler and Mussolini. Oxford University Press.
- Wistrich, Robert (2003). Hitler and the Holocaust. Modern Library. ISBN 0-8129-6863-8.
- Zitelmann, Rainer (2000) [1987]. Hitler: The Policies of Seduction. London House 2000, ISBN 1-902809-03-3.

== Indirectly related to Hitler ==
- Aly, Götz (2005). Hitler's Beneficiaries: Plunder, Racial War, and the Nazi Welfare State. Metropolitan. ISBN 978-0-8050-8726-0
- Bracher, K.D. (1970).The German Dictatorship: The Origins, Structure, and Effects of National Socialism. New York: Praeger Publishers. ASIN B001QKCJKW
- Broszat, Martin (1987). Hitler and the Collapse of Weimar Germany Translated by V. R. Berghahn. Providence: Berg. ISBN 0-85496-517-3.
- Broszat, Martin (2001). The Hitler State: The Foundation and Development Of The Internal Structure Of The Third Reich. Longman. ISBN 0-582-49200-9.
- Burleigh, Michael, Wippermann, Wolfgang (1991). The Racial State: Germany 1933–1945. Cambridge University Press. ISBN 978-0-521-39802-2
- Craig, Gordon (1983) [1949]. "The German Foreign Office from Neurath to Ribbentrop". In Craig, Gordon A.; Gilbert, Felix (eds.). Documents on German foreign Policy, 1918–1945, from the archives of the German Foreign Ministry. pp. 435–436. OCLC 21151259.
- Crozier, Andrew J. (1988). Appeasement and Germany's Last Bid for Colonies. London: Macmillan Press. ISBN 978-0-312-01546-6.
- Dawidowicz, Lucy (1976). A Holocaust Reader. New York: Behrman House. ISBN 978-0-87441-219-2.
- Dawidowicz, Lucy (1986) [1975]. The War Against the Jews. Bantam Books. ISBN 978-0-553-34532-2.
- Deist, Wilhelm, Messerschmidt, Manfred, Wette, Wolfram et al. (2008). Germany and the Second World War. Deutsche Verlags-Anstalt.
- Felton, Mark (2014). Guarding Hitler: The Secret World of the Führer. London: Pen and Sword Military. ISBN 978-1-78159-305-9.
- Fest, Joachim (2004). Inside Hitler's Bunker: The Last Days of the Third Reich. Farrar, Straus and Giroux. ISBN 0-374-13577-0
- Fest, Joachim (1996). Plotting Hitler's Death: The German Resistance to Hitler, 1933–1945. Weidenfeld & Nicolson. ISBN 0-297-81774-4
- Frei, Norbert (1993). National Socialist Rule in Germany: The Führer State 1933–1945. Blackwell Pub. ISBN 0-631-16858-3
- Grier, Howard D. (2007). Hitler, Dönitz, and the Baltic Sea: The Third Reich's Last Hope, 1944-1945. Annapolis, Md. Naval Institute Press. ASIN B00DKMWP1M
- Herzstein, Robert E. (1974). Adolf Hitler and the German Trauma, 1913–1945;: An Interpretation of the Nazi Phenomenon. Putnam. ISBN 0-399-11286-3
- Hoffmann, Peter (2000) [1979]. Hitler's Personal Security: Protecting the Führer 1921–1945. New York: Da Capo Press. ISBN 978-0-306-80947-7.
- Kershaw, Ian (2000). The Nazi Dictatorship: Problems and Perspectives of Interpretation. Arnold Publishers. ISBN 0-340-76028-1
- Ihrig, Stefan (2014). Atatürk in the Nazi Imagination. Harvard University Press. ISBN 978-0-674-74485-1
- Megargee, Geoffrey (2000). Inside Hitler's High Command. University Press of Kansas. ISBN 0-7006-1187-8
- Mitcham, Samuel W. (1992). Hitler's Commanders. Cooper Publishing Group. ISBN 978-1-4422-1153-7
- Nicholls, Anthony James (2000). Weimar and the Rise of Hitler. Palgrave Macmillan. ISBN 0-312-23351-5
- O'Donnell, J. P. (2001) [1978]. The Berlin Bunker. Da Capo Press. ISBN 0-306-80958-3
- Orlow, Dietrich (2008). The Nazi Party, 1919–1945: A Complete History. Enigma Books. ISBN 978-1-929631-57-5
- Rees, Laurence (1999). The Nazis: A Warning from History. New Press. ISBN 1-56584-551-X
- Röpke, Wilhelm (1946). The Solution to the German Problem. G. P. Putnam's Sons. OCLC 403661.
- Roth, J. et al. (2000). The Holocaust Chronicle. Publications International, Ltd. ISBN 0-7853-2963-3
- Shirer, William (1994) [1960]. The Rise and Fall of the Third Reich. Gramercy. ISBN 0-517-10294-3
- Shirer, William (1979). Berlin Diary: The Journal of a Foreign Correspondent 1934–1941. Viking. ISBN 0-14-005182-1
- Strobl, Gerwin (2000). The Germanic Isle: Nazi Perceptions of Britain. Cambridge: Cambridge University Press. ISBN 978-0-521-78265-4.
- Thorwald, Jürgen (1967). [1951] Defeat in the East: Russia Conquers – January to May 1945. Ballantine Books. ISBN 978-0-553-13469-8

== Memoirs of people who knew or worked for Hitler ==
- Baur, Hans (2013) [1956]. I was Hitler's Pilot. Frontline Books. ASIN B00FOGG0ZE
- Below, Nicolaus von (2010) [1980]. At Hitler's Side: The Memoirs of Hitler's Luftwaffe Adjutant 1937–1945. Frontline Books. ASIN B00XYX8VEC
- Dietrich, Otto (1955). The Hitler I Knew: Memoirs of the Third Reich's Press Chief. Henry Regnery Company.
- Dirksen, Herbert von (1952). Moscow Tokyo London: Twenty Years of German Foreign Policy. University of Oklahoma Press. ASIN B0007ISOLW
- Döhring, Herbert; Krause, Karl Wilhelm; Plaim, Anna (2018). Living with Hitler: Accounts of Hitler's Household Staff. Greenhill Books. ASIN B07FKHB1ZJ
- Dollmann, Eugen (1967). With Hitler and Mussolini: Memoirs of a Nazi Interpreter. Hutchinson, London. ASIN B000DCOS76
- Dönitz, Karl (2012) [1958]. Memoirs: Ten Years and Twenty Days. Frontline Books. ISBN 978-1-84832-644-6
- Gisevius, Hans Bernd (1998) [1947] . To the Bitter End. Da Capo Press. ASIN B06XGMK7M3
- Göring, Emmy (1972) [1963]. My Life with Goering. David Bruce & Watson. ASIN 0851270042
- Guderian, Heinz (1953) [1951]. Panzer Leader. Michael Joseph.
- Hanfstaengl, Ernst (1994) [1957]. Hitler: The Missing Years. Arcade Publishing. ISBN 1-55970-272-9
- Hanisch, Reinhold (1939) I Was Hitler's Buddy. New Republic.
- Hoffmann, Heinrich (2011) [1955]. Hitler was my Friend: The Memoirs of Hitler's Photographer Frontline Books. ASIN B00FOGFZYG
- Junge, Traudl (2003) Until the Final Hour: Hitler's Last Secretary. Weidenfeld & Nicolson. ASIN B00A39ET8C
- Kempka, Erich (2010) [1951]. I was Hitler's Chauffeur. Frontline Books. ISBN 1-84832-550-9
- Krebs, Albert (1976). The Infancy of Nazism: The Memoirs of Ex-Gauleiter Albert Krebs 1923–1933. New Viewpoints. ISBN 0-531-05376-8.
- Kubizek, August (1976). The Young Hitler I Knew. Greenwood. ISBN 0-8371-8664-1.
- Linge, Heinz (2009) [1980]. With Hitler to the End: The Memoirs of Adolf Hitler's Valet. Frontline Books. ASIN B00HESTJC6
- Ludecke, Kurt (2011). I Knew Hitler. Archive Media Publishing. ISBN 1-908538-00-7
- Mend, Hans von (2022) [1931]. I Served with Hitler in the Trenches: In the Field, 1914–1918 . Frontline Books. ISBN 978-1-3990-1001-6
- Misch, Rochus (2014). Hitler's Last Witness: The Memoirs of Hitler's Bodyguard. Frontline Books. ISBN 978-1-84832-749-8
- Papen, Franz von (1953) [1952]. Memoirs. E. P. Dutton & Company. ASIN B002GMSAS4
- Ribbentrop, Joachim von (1954). The Ribbentrop Memoirs. Weidenfeld and Nicolson. ASIN B071NW4SYQ
- Riefenstahl, Leni (1993). Leni Riefenstahl: A Memoir. St Martin's Press. ISBN 978-0-312-09843-8
- Röhm, Ernst (2012) [1928]. The Memoirs of Ernst Röhm. Frontline Books. ISBN 1-84832-599-1
- Schacht, Hjalmar (1955). My First Seventy-Six Years. Allan Wingate. ASIN B0007IWY90
- Schirach, Henriette von (1960) [1956]. The Price of Glory. Frederick Muller. ASIN B0000CKMHN
- Schmidt, Paul (1951). Hitler's Interpreter: The Secret History of German Diplomacy 1935–1945. William Heinemann. ASIN B01MCYE8RP
- Schroeder, Christa (2009) [1985]. He Was My Chief: The Memoirs of Adolf Hitler's Secretary. Frontline Books. ASIN B00CBJXZA0
- Speer, Albert (1997). Inside the Third Reich: Memoirs Simon & Schuster. ISBN 0-684-82949-5
- Strasser, Otto (1940). Hitler and I. New York: AMS Press. ASIN B000H7K6AK
- Weizsäcker, Ernst von (1951). Memoirs of Ernst Von Weizsacker. Victor Gollancz.
- Wagener, Otto (1985) [1978]. Hitler: Memoirs of a Confidant. Yale University Press. ISBN 978-0-300-03294-9

== Articles ==
- Aigner, Dietrich "Hitler's Ultimate Aims – A Programme of World Dominion?" pp. 251–266 from Aspects of the Third Reich edited by H.W. Koch, Macmillan: London, 1985.
- Bankier, David "Hitler and the Policy-Making Process on the Jewish Question" pp. 1–20 from Holocaust and Genocide Studies, Volume 3, 1988.
- Bloch, Eduard "My Patient, Hitler" pp. 35–37 from Collier's, March 15, 1941.
- Bloch, Eduard "My Patient, Hitler" pp. 69–73 from Collier's, March 22, 1941.
- Binion, Rudolph "Hitler's Concept of "Lebensraum": the Psychological Basis" pp. 187–215 from History of Childhood Quarterly, Volume 1, 1973.
- Binion, R. "Foam on the Hitler Wave" pp. 552–558 from Journal of Modern History, Volume 46, 1974.
- Bracher, K.D. "The Role of Hitler: Perspectives of Interpretation" pp. 193–212 from Fascism: A Reader's Guide, edited by Walter Laqueur, Harmondsworth, 1979.
- Broszat, M. "Hitler and the Genesis of the 'Final Solution': An Assessment of David Irving's Theses" pp. 73–125 from Yad Vashem Studies, Volume 13, c1979; reprinted pp. 390–429 in Aspects of the Third Reich edited by H.W. Koch, London: Macmillan, 1985, ISBN 0-333-35272-6.
- Bullock, A. "Hitler and the Origins of the Second World War" pp. 221–246 from European Diplomacy Between Two Wars, 1919–1939, edited by Hans W. Gatzke, Chicago: Quadrangle Books, 1972.
- Carr, William "The Hitler Image in the Last Half-Century" pp. 462–488 from Aspects of the Third Reich, edited by H.W. Koch, Macmillan: London, 1985.
- Erikson, Erik "The Legend of Hitler's Youth" pp. 370–396 from Political Man and Social Man edited by Robert Paul Wolff, New York, 1966.
- Fest, J. "On Remembering Adolf Hitler" pp. 19–34 from Encounter, Volume 41, October 1973.
- Hale, Oron James "Adolf Hitler: Taxpayer" pp. 830–842 from American Historical Review, Volume 60, 1955.
- Hauner, Milan "Did Hitler Want World Domination?" pp. 15–32 from Journal of Contemporary History. Volume 13, 1978.
- Hildebrand, K. "Hitler's War Aims" pp. 522–530 from The Journal of Modern History, Volume 48, Issue # 3 September 1976.
- Hillgruber, A. "Hitler's Program" pp. 49–55 from Germany and the Two World Wars. Cambridge: Harvard University Press, 1981.
- Hillgruber, A. "England's Place in Hitler's Plans for World Dominion" pp. 5–22 from Journal of Contemporary History, Volume 9, 1974.
- Hoffmann, Peter "Hitler's Personal Security" pp. 151–171 from Police Forces In History, edited by George Mosse, Beverly Hills, 1975.
- Hoffmann, Peter "Maurice Bavaud's Attempt to Assassinate Hitler in 1938" pp. 173–204 from Police Forces In History edited by G. Mosse, Beverly Hills, 1975.
- Kater, M. "Hitler in a Social Context" pp. 243–272 from Central European History, Volume 14, 1981.
- Kettenacker, Lothar "Social and Psychological Aspects of the Führer's Rule" pp. 96–132 from Aspects of the Third Reich, edited by H.W. Koch, Macmillan: London, 1985.
- Koch, H.W. "Hitler and the Origins of the Second World War Second Thoughts on the Status of Some of the Documents" pp. 125–143 from The Historical Journal, Volume 11, No. 1 1968.
- Koch, H.W. "Hitler's Programme and the Genesis of Operation 'Barbarossa'" pp. 285–324 from Aspects of the Third Reich, edited by H.W. Koch, Macmillan: London, 1985.
- Michaelis, Meier "World Power Status or World Dominion? A Survey of the Literature on Hitler's 'Plan of World Dominion' (1937–1970)" pp. 331–360 from Historical Journal. Volume 15, 1972.
- Mommsen, H. "Hitler's Position in the Nazi System" pp. 163–188 from From Weimar to Auschwitz. Oxford, 1991.
- Mommsen, H. "Reflections on the Position of Hitler and Göring in the Third Reich" pp. 86–97 from Reevaluating the Third Reich edited by Jane Caplan and Thomas Childers, New York, 1993.
- Preston, Paul "Franco and Hitler: The Myth of Hendaye 1940" pp. 1–16 from Contemporary European History, Volume 1, 1992.
- Robertson, E.M. "Hitler's Planning for War and the Response of the Great Powers" pp. 196–234 from Aspects of the Third Reich, edited by H.W. Koch, Macmillan: London, 1985.
- Trevor-Roper, H. "Hitlers Kriegsziele" pp. 121–133 from Vierteljahrshefte für Zeitsgeschichte, Volume 8, 1960, translated into English as "Hitler's War Aims" pp. 235–250 from Aspects of The Third Reich edited by H.W. Koch, London: Macmillan Ltd, 1985.
- Watt, D.C. "Hitler's Visit to Rome and the May Weekend Crisis: A Study In Hitler's Response to External Stimuli" pp. 23–32 from Journal of Contemporary History, Volume 9, 1974.
- Weinberg, G. "Adolf Hitler" pp. 5–38 from Visions of Victory: The Hopes of Eight World War II Leaders, Cambridge: Cambridge University Press, 2005.
- Weinberg, G. "Hitler's Private Testament of May 2, 1938" pp. 415–419 from Journal of Modern History, Volume 27, 1955.
- Weinberg, G. "Hitler's Image of the United States" pp. 1006–1021 from American Historical Review, Volume 69, Issue #4, July 1964.
- Weinberg, G. "Hitler and England: Pretense and Reality" pp. 299–309 from German Studies Review, Volume 8, 1985.
- Weinberg, Gerhard; Topitsch, Ernst; Taylor, A.; Taylor, B. (June 1989). "Review of Stalin's War: A Radical New Theory of the Origins of the Second World War by Ernst Topitsch". The American Historical Review. 94 (3): 800–801. doi:10.2307/1873876. JSTOR 1873876.
- Weinberg, G. "The World Through Hitler's Eyes" pp. 30–56 from Germany, Hitler and World War II Essays in Modern German and World History, Cambridge: Cambridge University Press, 1995.
- Wilson, B. (1996). "Mein Diat; Adolf Hitler's Diet". New Statesman. 127 (4406): 40. Archived from the original on January 30, 2005 – via FindArticles.

== See also ==
- Adolf Hitler in popular culture
- Bibliography of Nazi Germany
- Bibliography of World War II
- Adolf Hitler's private library
