= Jean-Marie Loret =

Alleged illegitimate son of Adolf Hitler

- Born: Jean-Marie Lobjoie; March 1918; Seboncourt, France
- Died: 13 February 1985 (aged 66); Saint-Quentin, France
- Occupation: Railway worker
- Known for: Allegedly being Adolf Hitler's son
- Children: 10
- Parent(s): Adolf Hitler (Claimed); Charlotte Lobjoie

Jean-Marie Loret (né Lobjoie; 18 or 25 March 1918 – 13 February 1985) was a French railway worker who claimed to be Nazi dictator Adolf Hitler's illegitimate son. According to Loret, his mother revealed to him in 1948 (a few years before her death) that Hitler was the "unknown German soldier" with whom she conceived a child during World War I. Hitler's valet Heinz Linge claimed in his memoirs that he witnessed Heinrich Himmler speak over the phone with Hitler, implying he wanted to find a woman and her son in their French village.

Loret's claim was backed by German historian Werner Maser, who first brought the claim to public attention in 1977 following an article in Zeitgeschichte magazine. Loret published his own autobiography, Ton père s'appelait Hitler (Your father was called Hitler) in 1981. However, historians and DNA analysis have shown his claim to be false.

== Biography ==
Jean-Marie Loret was born illegitimately in 1918 in Seboncourt as Jean-Marie Lobjoie. His mother was Charlotte Eudoxie Alida Lobjoie (15 March 1898 – 13 April 1951), daughter of Louis Joseph Alfred Lobjoie, a butcher, and his wife, Marie Flore Philomène Colpin. According to the birth registry of his home town, Loret's father was an "unidentified German soldier" during World War I. Adolf Hitler had stayed in the localities of Seclin, Fournes-en-Weppes, Wavrin, and Ardooie during the years 1916 and 1917, and, according to eyewitnesses, he supposedly had a relationship with Charlotte. As a result, the idea that Hitler could be Loret's father was a perennial topic of discussion.

Lobjoie was a dancer, although she apparently only took up the profession after she moved to Paris, months after the birth of Jean-Marie and the end of World War I. Jean-Marie spent his first seven years with his grandparents, with whom Charlotte had no contact after moving to Paris. On 22 May 1922 Charlotte married Clément Loret, a lithographer, who declared he would support his wife's illegitimate son and would allow him to bear his own last name. According to Jean-Marie, his grandparents had "treated him badly." After their deaths in the mid-1920s, his aunt, Alice Lobjoie, worked to have her nephew adopted by the family of the wealthy construction magnate Frizon from Saint Quentin. From then on, Jean-Marie attended consecutively Catholic boarding schools in Cambrai and Saint Quentin.

In 1936, Jean-Marie entered the French Army and was promoted over the years to staff sergeant. After World War II, he was a businessman, but had to give that up in 1948 because of insolvency. Loret said he always knew that his father had been a German soldier, but he had no idea of his identity. He claimed that his mother told him in 1948, shortly before her death, that the soldier was Adolf Hitler.

During World War II, Loret worked as chargé de mission with the French police in Saint-Quentin, Aisne. On 8 June 1978, during a public discussion, historian Werner Maser moved Loret to his own house in Speyer, Germany, to seclude him from the intense scrutiny by the press of Loret's home in Saint-Quentin. Maser and Loret visited several places, including the former concentration camp at Dachau, where Loret supposedly said: "I didn't choose my father." Maser took Loret with him as he travelled to lecture on his parentage, even bringing him to Tokyo. However, the Frenchman was reluctant to give interviews. In 1979, Loret and Maser had a falling-out and parted company. Subsequently, Loret, in collaboration with René Mathot, published his autobiography, Ton père s'appelait Hitler [Your father was called Hitler] in 1981. On 13 February 1985, Loret died of a heart attack in France.

== The Loret–Hitler connection ==
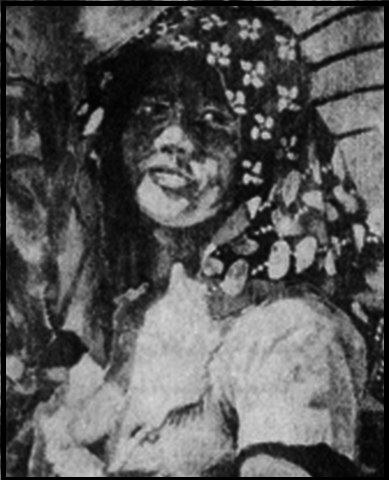
Charlotte Lobjoie

In his 1980 memoirs, Hitler's valet Heinz Linge states that in mid-1940 Hitler told a number of people that he had associations with a particular French village stemming from World War I but going beyond his duties as a soldier. Then, on 19 July, Linge was in the same room as Heinrich Himmler when the latter took a call from Hitler. Himmler was tasked with finding someone in that village, and after Linge left the room so Himmler could continue the conversation in private, he overheard discussion of a woman and her son. Linge believed that Loret's account corresponded with these implications.

Maser maintained that he had heard of a reputed son of Hitler for the first time in 1965 while doing research in Wavrin and surrounding cities. He followed up on these reports, met Loret in the process, and was able to convince him to let the story be published. Historians, including Anton Joachimsthaler, criticised Maser for pursuing commercial motives and sensationalism. Other historians, such as Timothy Ryback and Ian Kershaw, argued that Hitler's paternity of Loret was unlikely to be proven.

According to Maser's portrayal, a 28-year-old Hitler had met the 19-year-old Charlotte in the city of Lille, in the German-occupied part of France, while stationed there as a soldier. She stated that "One day I was cutting hay with other women when we saw a German soldier on the other side of the street. I was designated to approach him." Maser wrote in his Hitler biography on the relationship of Hitler and Lobjoie:

At the beginning of 1916 the young woman had met the German soldier Adolf Hitler for the first time. She stayed first in Premont, allowed herself to fall into a sexual relationship with him, and followed him until autumn 1917 to, among other places, Seboncourt, Forunes, Wavrin and Noyelles-lès-Seclin in Northern France – and, in May, June and July 1917, also to Ardooie in Belgium.

Despite not being able to speak the same language, Hitler and Charlotte purportedly continued their relationship and frequently went on country walks and shared drinks at night. Loret was ultimately conceived after a ‘tipsy’ evening in the summer of 1917 in Ardooie. Later, Charlotte would recall to her son that the soldier had a short temper and would often rant in German:

When your father was around, which was very rarely, he liked to take me for walks in the countryside. But these walks usually ended badly. In fact, your father, inspired by nature, launched into speeches which I did not really understand. He did not speak French, but solely ranted in German, talking to an imaginary audience. Even if I spoke German I would not be able to follow him, as the histories of Prussia, Austria and Bavaria were not familiar to me at all, far from it. My reaction used to anger your father so much that I did not show any reaction.

The critics of this account point out that Maser had no evidence of this beyond Loret's own claims. A genetic certification of his biological inheritance, done at the University of Heidelberg, resulted in the findings that "at best, Loret could be Hitler's son". Maser further claimed that evidence for Hitler's paternity included Charlotte's commitment to a French sanatorium which was allegedly at Hitler's instruction after the German invasion of France, and a protracted interrogation of Loret by the Gestapo in the Hotel Lutetia, the Gestapo headquarters in Paris, as well as Loret's alleged collaboration with the Gestapo as a policeman.

Maser's questioning of Alice Lobjoie, Loret's aunt and Charlotte's sister, whom he had wanted to bring into play as "crown witness" for his claim, rendered, instead, a negative result. Alice stated that her sister had indeed entertained a romantic relationship with a German soldier, but she disputed vehemently that this soldier had been Hitler. She stated that she could remember the man's face quite well and knew that this face had no resemblance to Hitler. In addition, she stated for the record: "Jean is a nutcase. Only the Germans talked up that Hitler story to him."

In addition to Alice's assertion, critics of Maser's thesis, such as historian Joachimsthaler, among others, introduced into the debate testimonials from Hitler's war comrades, who, in their recollections of Hitler during World War I, unanimously noted that he was absolutely against any relationships between German soldiers and French women. Balthasar Brandmayer for example, in his 1932 memoir Two Dispatch-Runners, reported that Hitler had reacted in the most violent terms against the intent of his regiment-mates to get involved with French women and had reproached them for having "no German sense of honour".

Furthermore, there were logical inconsistencies in Maser's story: that it is highly improbable that any soldier in the war, let alone a private ranking low in the military hierarchy, would have been able to take a lover with him through all the relocations of his regiment, as Hitler had done with Lobjoie, according to Maser's account. Free movement would scarcely have been possible in the occupied areas, and having Charlotte travel along with the regiment is very doubtful. During the course of the 1979 Aschaffenburger Historians' Moot, Maser at first kept quiet on the matter. Finally, in his own contribution to the discussion, he abruptly declared a possible illegitimate son of Hitler to be a marginal matter. Joachimsthaler designated this to be Maser's "own private end goal".

Following the 2005 publication of his book Fälschung, Dichtung und Wahrheit über Hitler und Stalin (Forgery, Fiction and Truth about Hitler and Stalin), Maser reaffirmed in an interview with the extreme right-wing-oriented National-Zeitung that he stood by his thesis, just as before, and maintained that Loret "was unambiguously Hitler's son", and that this had been "acknowledged in France on the part of officials".

=== DNA investigations ===
In 2008, the Belgian journalist Jean-Paul Mulders travelled to Germany, Austria, France and the United States to collect DNA of the last living relatives of Hitler. He also obtained DNA from postcard stamps sent by Jean-Marie Loret. By comparing DNA from the stamps with that of a relative of Hitler's with a common paternal ancestor, Mulders proved that Loret lacked a matching Y chromosome and was thus not Hitler's son.

In 2012, the French magazine Le Point published a news article, reporting that a study enlisted by Loret carried out by the University of Heidelberg showed Hitler and Loret were of the same blood group, and that another enlisted by Loret showed they had similar handwriting. The article also stated that official German Army paperwork proves officers brought envelopes of cash to Lobjoie during World War II occupation, and described a suggestion by the family's lawyer that they may be able to claim royalties from Hitler's Mein Kampf. In 2018, Russian state-owned TV channel NTV interviewed Philippe Loret, the son of Jean-Marie Loret and Muguette Dubecq. The interview was filmed at Loret's home, which was decorated with Nazi relics. Loret spoke of a Rothschild family conspiracy and stated his intention to undergo a DNA test.
