= Unmasked =

Unmasked may refer to:

- Unmasked (Kiss album), 1980
  - Unmasked Tour, a 1980 concert tour by the hard rock group Kiss
- Unmasked (Ira Losco album)
- Unmasked (radio show), an American radio show
- Unmasked (Left Behind: The Kids), a book written by Jerry B. Jenkins and Tim LaHaye
- "Unmasked" (The Following), an episode of the TV series The Following
- Unmasked (1917 film), a film added to the United States National Film Registry in 2014
- Unmasked (1929 film), an American mystery film directed by Edgar Lewis
- Unmasked (1950 film), an American crime film
- "Unmasked" (Arrow), an episode of the television series Arrow
- "UnmAsked" (Pretty Little Liars), a 2012 episode of the television series Pretty Little Liars
- Unmasked: Two Confidential Interviews with Hitler in 1931
- Unmasked: Inside Antifa’s Radical Plan to Destroy Democracy, 2021 book

== See also ==
- Unmasking (disambiguation)
