= Elizabeth Wiskemann =

English journalist and historian

D.Litt. Elizabeth Wiskemann
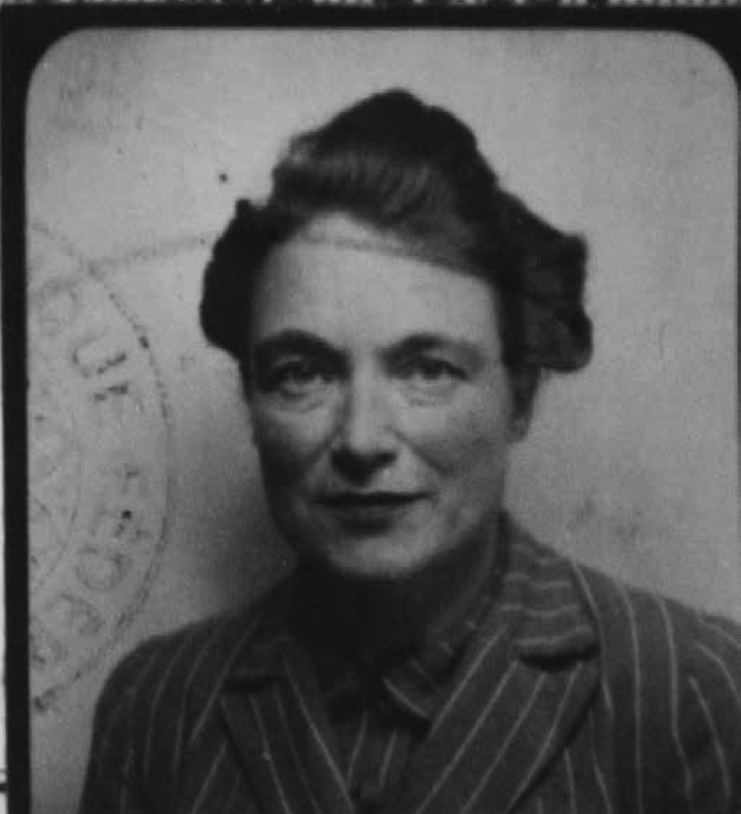
- Undercover Swiss passport photo issued 27 May 1940
- Born: 13 August 1899; Sidcup, London, England
- Died: 5 July 1971 (aged 71)
- Parents: Heinrich Odomar Hugo Wiskemann; Emily Burton

Academic background
- Education: Notting Hill High School
- Alma mater: Newnham College, University of Cambridge

Academic work
- Discipline: History, Diplomatic relations
- Institutions: University of Edinburgh; Chatham House; University of Cambridge; University of Sussex; University of Oxford
- Notable works: Oxford University Press; Czechs and Germans; Undeclared War; The Rome-Berlin Axis; Italy
- Writing career
- Notable works: The New Statesman; The Europe I Saw; The Contemporary Review; The Scotsman; The Guardian; Germany’s Eastern Neighbours; Neue Zürcher Zeitung
- Espionage activity
- Allegiance: United Kingdom
- Agency: Electra House; Political Warfare Executive
- Active: World War II

Elizabeth Meta Wiskemann (13 August 1899 – 5 July 1971) was an English journalist and historian of Anglo-German ancestry. She was an intelligence officer in World War II, and the Montagu Burton Chair in International Relations at the University of Edinburgh.

== Early life and education ==
Wiskemann was born in Sidcup, a suburb of London, England, on 13 August 1899. Her mother, Emily Burton, belonged to a prosperous family of local merchants, and her father, Heinrich Odomar Hugo Wiskemann, a businessman from Hesse-Cassel in Germany, had emigrated to England in order to avoid being conscripted into the Prussian army. She was educated at Notting Hill High School, where she won multiple academic prizes, as well as participating in debating, sports, and drama. She received a scholarship to read History at Newnham College, Cambridge, where she obtained a first in History in 1921. During this time, her family suffered several misfortunes, with her mother dying during an influenza pandemic in 1918, and her father filing for bankruptcy in 1922. Her contemporaries and friends at Cambridge included many linked to the Bloomsbury set, including Ferenc Bekassy, Rupert Brooke, Julian Bell, Michael Redgrave, and Kathleen Raine.

In 1923, her father returned to Germany, where he spent the rest of his life. Supporting herself, Elizabeth Wiskemann briefly worked as a teacher in a girls' boarding school, before beginning her doctoral dissertation, winning a research scholarship from the Gilchrist Educational Trust. She initially made good progress, but missed a research fellowship from Newnham College, receiving instead a small research grant. Her dissertation in later stages was supervised by H.W.V. Temperley, and received only a D.Litt. instead of a Ph.D. Wiskemann attributed this to Temperley's documented hostility towards female students, noting that other members of the examining committee were inclined to award the Ph.D. but could not oppose him.

Her dissertation examined diplomatic relations between the Vatican, Britain, and France in the 1860s, drawing extensively on archives in all three locations. Consequently, she traveled extensively in Europe during these years, taking up tutoring work to fund her travels.

== Career ==
=== Journalism ===
In autumn of 1930, Wiskemann visited Berlin, staying for a period of nine months, to continue her historical research and improve her command over the German language. In the 1920s, Germany was a favorite destination of British intellectuals disenchanted with British life, and it was common for those intellectuals seeking an "alternative lifestyle" to settle in Germany, usually in Berlin. In the "Golden Twenties" as Germans called the years between 1924-1929, Germany was perceived in Britain as the home of "liberalism, modernism, and hedonism...avant-garde art and architecture...social deviance and sexual decadence". The image of Germany in the Golden Twenties across the North Sea was of a more open and free society, and as such tended to attract homosexuals such as Christopher Isherwood and W. H. Auden who wanted to live in a society where it was less likely they would suffer criminal convictions for their sexuality or women such as Jean Ross or Wiskemann who wanted to "learn about life" and have careers. Wiskemann recalled that moving to Berlin was a liberation from her "miserable" years at Cambridge, where had been grudgingly tolerated by the male-dominated faculty doing her postgraduate research. She recalled that in circles of left-wing intellectuals that she associated with in Berlin that she felt more valued than she had ever been at Cambridge. The American historian Colin Storer wrote it was no accident that Wiskemann chose to settle in Berlin, a city that was identified with modernity and was viewed as the home of the "New Woman", able to make a career for herself instead of waiting for the right man to marry. Wiskemann seems to be greatly influenced by photographs of German women working as pilots, driving sports cars and working as scientists. The German historian Katherina von Ankum wrote that Wiskemann had an already outdated image of German women as a "resurrection of traditional notions of (German) womanhood" was already on the rise when she arrived in Berlin as a part of a backlash against the gains that German women had made with the November Revolution of 1918.

Over the next six years, she divided her time between Cambridge, where she worked as a tutor in history at Newnham College, and Germany, using the time to travel through Europe as well. She socialised there with Phyllis Dobb, Arthur Koestler, Erich Mendelsohn, and George Grosz, recounting her experiences in her memoir, The Europe I Saw, as well as in letters to friends, including Julian Bell. In Berlin, she worked as a translator and English teacher, preparing documents for the British Embassy and tutoring German diplomats in English. During this time, she closely observed political developments, witnessing in particular the rise of Nazism, and her interest was enabled by a friendship with the journalist Frederick A. Voigt, who was reporting for the Guardian. in 1932, she began writing for the New Statesman, reporting on German politics and warning about the dangers of Nazism, to which she was firmly opposed, and her writings were widely read. She also opposed British politicians who advocated a moderate approach to the Third Reich, particularly criticizing the signing of naval treaties between England and Germany during this time.

She rapidly became the New Statesman's main correspondent from Germany, and during this time, also wrote for The Contemporary Review, The Scotsman, and The Guardian. Along with interviews of major German politicians, she also reported on significant political events, including the Saar plebiscite, and during her time in England, frequently attempted to reach out to politicians to convince them of the dangers that Nazism posed, with little success.

In March 1936, she visited Switzerland, which she charged was the most provincial country in Europe. She wrote about the Swiss: "The percentage of genuinely cosmopolitan or even Continentally minded people was probably smaller than in any of the major European countries. The sentiments which prevailed in Switzerland are small-scale provincialism...and the fierce nationalism of a small country with virtually no language of its own. As this nationalism involves the Swiss in being oddly aggressive about the defense of their neutrality, which they have elevated into providing their national mystique: it seems a little absurd to an outsider at first".

In July 1936, she published an article in The New Statesman, sharply criticizing the Third Reich, and particularly, the manner in which Jewish people were treated by the Nazis. As a result, she was arrested and interrogated by the Gestapo, and finally released on the condition that she would leave Germany. Her expulsion from Germany attracted a great deal of international attention, and was discussed in the British Parliament as a diplomatic issue. On her return to England, she was advised by the head of the Foreign Office to continue writing about Germany, but to avoid returning there in person. Following her expulsion from Germany, Wiskemann continued to report from Central Europe, traveling to Poland, Austria, Hungary, Czechoslovakia, and Romania.

=== Academic career ===
Wiskemann spent a substantial period of time in Czechoslovakia, following her expulsion from Germany in the 1930s. She published essays and reports on Czechoslavak politics, facilitated in part by her acquaintance with Czechoslovak minister-plenipotentiary Jan Masaryk, to whom she had been introduced by a mutual friend. From 1935, she also frequently lectured at Chatham House on central European politics. In 1937, Wiskemann was commissioned by the historian Arnold Toynbee, to write an account of the volksdeutsche (the German minorities outside the Reich), particularly those living in Czechoslovakia, for a series of monographs published by the Royal Institute of International Affairs. Consequently, resigning from Cambridge, she traveled back to Czechoslovakia for research, and in 1938 she published Czechs and Germans: A Study of the Struggles in the Historic Provinces of Bohemia and Moravia. During the writing of her book, Toynbee-who supported appeasement-was opposed to Wiskemann's "pro-Czech" book and made a number of efforts to "correct" her book. Toynbee came under pressure from the Foreign Office not to publish her book in the spring and summer of 1938. The diplomat Robert Hadow wrote to Toynbee on 16 May 1938 that publishing Wiskemann's book would be "a set-back to the very real effort...which is being made to bring M. Benes to a sense of the "realities" of the situation and so to direct him into negotiations with Henlein". Despite his own opposition to the book, Toynbee published Czechs and Germans. The book, a historical account, received praise, as "indispensable introduction to the closer study of the problem of Czechoslovakia," in International Affairs, and "...an excellent account of the relations between Czechs and the Germans in Habsburg times," in the American Historical Review. The chief limitation of this work was Wiskemann's limited grasp of Czech, and the book also faced some opposition from the British Foreign Office, who saw it as espousing Czech causes. It also received substantial attention in the press, as Lord Runciman, delegated to mediate in Czechoslovakia, was photographed by media sources reading the book as he left for Prague.

Following the publication of this book, Wiskemann engaged in a lecture tour, visiting the United States of America, while continuing to publish on issues of central European politics. In New York, she accepted an invitation from Oxford University Press' office to write an account of German politics after the Munich conference, publishing Undeclared War in 1939. The book focused on the impact of the Third Reich on Hungary, Romania, Yugoslavia, and Bulgaria, and was written in three months. Noting the haste, the historian R.W. Seton-Watson nonetheless called it a "valuable and welcome contribution to the contemporary history of south-eastern Europe". Richard Coventry, writing for The New Statesman, called it "the best book of the year so far as European politics are concerned." In 1939, she published a book, Undeclared War, which was written in the spring of 1939, but published shortly after Poland was invaded in September. She was to regret the title of her book, which made it seemed dated even before it was published.

=== Intelligence ===
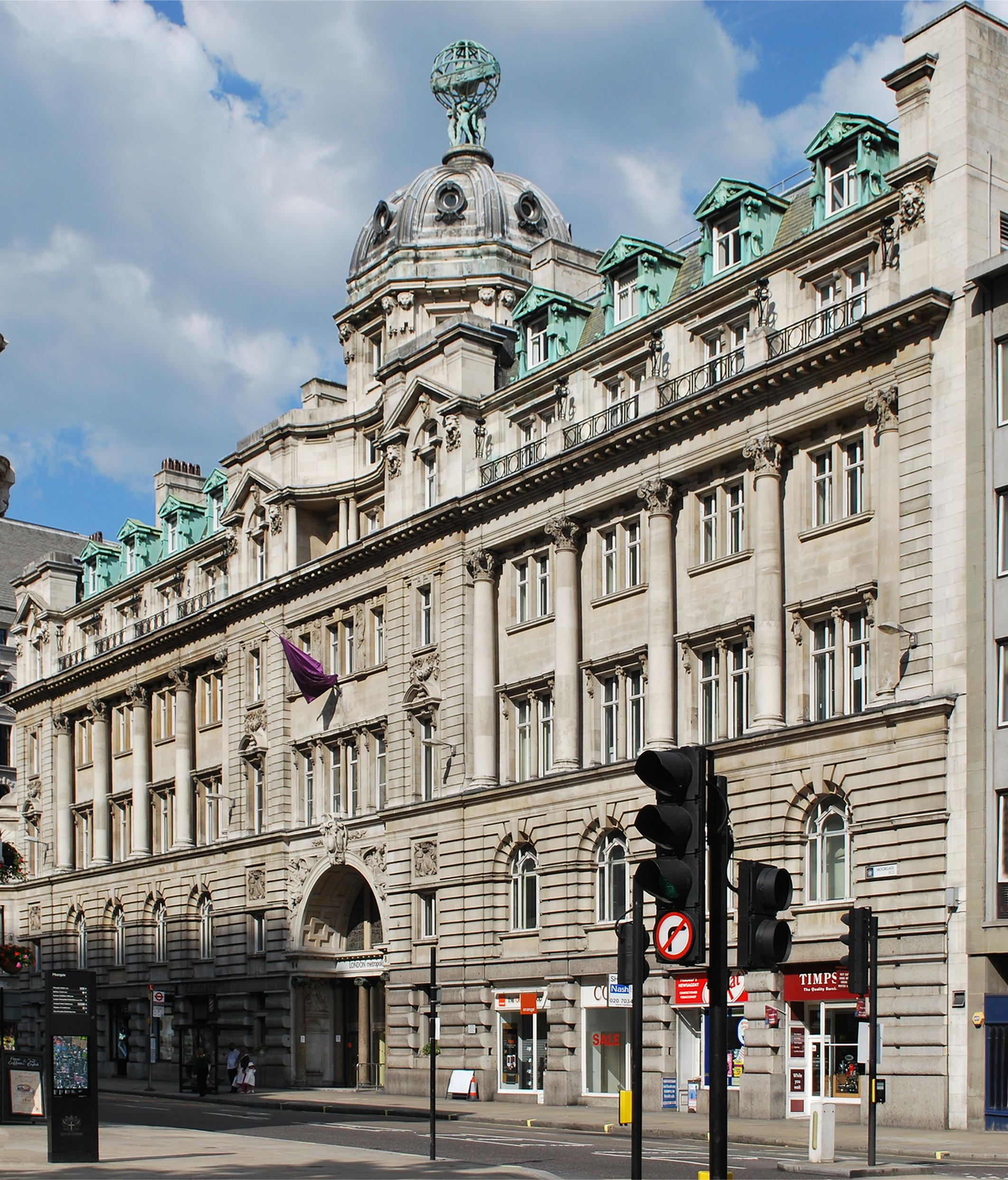
Electra House was the eponymously named department that operated out of Electra House. Both the buildings and the department were overseen by Campbell Stuart.

In 1939, Wiskemann turned down a job offer from the BBC, and applied for jobs in the field of intelligence, eventually being recruited by the Foreign Office's Electra House (precursor to the Political Warfare Executive), which was primarily working in propaganda. She was sent to Switzerland, where she was ostensibly writing a book for the Oxford University Press, and later worked as an attache to the British legation in Bern, while continuing to report for various publications. During this time, Wiskemann was charged with gathering information, particularly from Germany and territories occupied by the Germans. Using her contacts, she was able to establish a substantial network of informants, and related information back to the Foreign Office through World War II. In 1941 she left Switzerland, making her way back to London, returning to Bern with diplomatic rank, at her insistence, a year later. From 1942 to 1944, she provided information from Bern on resistance efforts, socio-economic issues, and continued expanding her network of informants. The Foreign Office provided her with an assistant, Elizabeth Scott-Montagu, the daughter of Lord John Scott, to enable her to continue sending detailed and extensive reports. The information that she provided to the British Foreign Office included socio-economic conditions, public opinion and morale, details of labor camps and the deportation of Jews from Hungary to Auschwitz, and mass killings and euthanasia programs in Romania and Poland. She often collaborated with American intelligence officer Allen Dulles, who was also in Bern at the time, and later became the head of the CIA.

There is some evidence to indicate that Wiskemann's reports were one of the first official reports of the mass killings at Auschwitz-Birkenau to reach British intelligence, and may have played a role in stopping the deportation of Jewish people from Hungary to the Auschwitz concentration camp. In 1942, Wiskemann provided information about the mass deportation of Jewish people from Hungary and Czechoslovakia to Auschwitz, following warnings from Gerhart Riegner about plans for the genocide of Jewish people in Germany. Jaromir Kopecky, a Czech diplomat and Gerhart Riegner informed Wiskemann of the impending danger to a group of Czech Jewish people who were placed in quarantine and were about to be deported to Auschwitz. Wiskemann, knowing that information was being intercepted by Hungarian intelligence, sent a deliberately unencrypted telegram from Richard Lichtheim, a representative of the Jewish Agency for Palestine, indicating this danger, and included the names and addresses of Hungarian government officials who were best placed to stop the deportation, recommended that they should be targeted by British intelligence, and also passing it on to Allen Dulles, an American intelligence officer. Historian Martin Gilbert described what happened next that led the Hungarian Regent, Admiral Horthy, to halt to the deportations:

The immediate cause of Horthy's intervention was an American daylight bombing raid on Budapest on 2 July. This raid had nothing to do with the appeal to bomb the railway lines to Auschwitz; it was part of a long-established pattern of bombing German fuel depots and railway marshalling yards. But the raid had gone wrong, as many did, and several government buildings in Budapest, as well as the private homes of several senior Hungarian Government officials, had been hit.

During her time as an intelligence officer, Wiskemann remained closely involved with German resistance members, passing on information about the Holocaust to British intelligence officials despite receiving instructions that she was not to report on the subject, receiving a letter in 1944 instructing her that they were "not interested at this stage in the war in German atrocities in the occupied territories or in the shootings of Jews in Poland and Hungary." As public attitude changed in 1945, Wiskemann's reports of the genocide of Jewish people gained more attention.

After the end of World War II, Wiskemann was invited to remain in intelligence work, primarily to stay in Germany and work in 're-education' of German citizens. She refused the offer, and returned to working in academia and journalism. In 1945, after Wiskemann retired from her work as an intelligence officer during World War II, she relocated to Italy to study political conditions there for her next research project. During this time she financially supported herself through journalism, reporting on Italian politics for The Economist, Spectator, and The Observer. She wrote weekly book reviews for the Times Literary Supplement, and in addition, undertook translations for publishers during this time.

=== Return to Academia ===
After World War II, Wiskemann began her next project, on Italian political history. She relocated to Rome, supporting herself through journalism, and published two books on Italian political history. She first published Italy (1947) for Oxford University Press, a brief overview of the country's politics as part of a larger series for the publisher. In 1949, she published a pioneering study of the relationship between Hitler and Mussolini, titled The Rome-Berlin Axis, drawing from their personal papers and letters as well as eyewitness accounts. The book received positive reviews and was widely read, becoming a standard text in reading lists on this period with historian Hugh Trevor-Roper describing it as "a definitive work of contemporary history", although it was criticised by A.J.P Taylor for being, in his view, too sympathetic to the Italian point of view. In 1953, Wiskemann was invited by historian Hugh Seton-Watson to write a volume about the population of Germans displaced from the eastern German border in 1945, and she published Germany’s Eastern Neighbours: Problems Relating to the Oder-Neisse Line and the Czech Frontier Region, the first English-language book to address the subject, in 1956. In this work she rejected post-war German demands to its former territories now being part of Poland, and concluded that in the past territorial gains brought out the "worst elements" in Germany, she wrote that nobody wanted German minorities back in Eastern Europe, considering their record in the past.

Along with Sir John Wheeler-Bennett, Sir Lewis Namier, A. L. Rowse and Margaret George, Wishemann was a leading member of the "guilty men" school of histography, which condemned the "appeasers" as the "guilty men" who aided and abetted the rise of Nazi Germany. In 1965, she wrote she "could make no claim to detachment about the history of Europe between 1919-1945". About efforts to rehabilitate the reputation of Neville Chamberlain, she was uncompromising, declaring that Chamberlain was a "stubborn, vain, naïf and ignorant" prime minister. About Chamberlain's three visits to Germany in September 1938 for summits with Adolf Hitler at Berchtesgaden, Bad Godesberg, and Munich, she wrote: "Hitler was insatiable and he asked for everything in the name of preserving a peace he despised". Along with many other British historians, she assigned a decisive importance to the Yugoslav coup d'état of 27 March 1941 to the course of World War Two, writing: "The attack upon Russia was originally to have taken place in the middle of May [1941], but the crushing of Yugoslavia delayed it for about five weeks". In this way, she argued that the invasion of Yugoslavia, which had prompted by Hitler's anger about the coup in Belgrade, delayed Operation Barbarossa for a crucial five weeks with momentous consequences for the war.

During the 1950s, she continued to publish, writing a history of the Swiss newspaper Neue Zürcher Zeitung, a memoir titled The Europe I Saw (1968), and directing a research project on the territorial dispute in Trieste for the Carnegie Foundation.

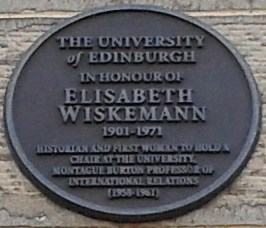
Memorial plaque at the University of Edinburgh

From 1958 to 1961 she was Montague Burton Professor of International Relations at University of Edinburgh, becoming the first woman to hold a chair in any field of study at the university. and was a tutor in Modern History at the University of Sussex from 1961 until 1964. In 1965 she received an honorary degree from the University of Oxford.

== Personal life ==
Wiskemann never married, but had a wide circle of friends which at one time another included Leonard Woolf, F. A. Voigt and Guglielmo Alberti. At Cambridge, she had a brief affair with the poet William Empson, during which the discovery of contraceptives in his rooms at the university (in breach of university rules) led to his expulsion from the university. Later, travelling in Europe after completing her D. Litt, she dated the poet Julian Bell, who was then living in Paris, but the affair did not survive her return to England. While working in Switzerland as an intelligence agent, she was in a relationship with Harry Bergholz, a German scholar who had fled to Switzerland after being suspected of anti-Nazi activity, and made efforts to assist him in his status as a refugee, and they maintained a close friendship long after the relationship ended. She was also romantically involved with Marchese Francesco Antinori, an Italian diplomat and official who had acted as a liaison between Hitler and Mussolini, and had provided information about them to British intelligence.

== Death ==
In 1955, Wiskemann began experiencing difficulties with her vision, and in 1959, underwent a cataract surgery which was unsuccessful, resulting in the loss of vision in one eye. Increasingly concerned by the loss of her vision, and with it, her independence, she wrote to friends, including Leonard Woolf, about her concerns, particularly her increasingly difficulty with reading. She died by suicide at her home in London on 5 July 1971, taking a lethal amount of barbiturates in addition to attempting to gas herself.

== Major publications ==
- Czechs and Germans (1938)
- Undeclared War (1939)
- Italy (1947)
- The Rome-Berlin Axis (1949)
- Germany's Eastern Neighbours (1956)
- A Great Swiss Newspaper: the Story of the 'Neue Zürcher Zeitung' (1959)
- The Europe of the Dictators 1919-1945 (1966)
- The Europe I Saw (1968)
- Fascism in Italy (1969)
- Italy Since 1945 (published posthumously, 1971)

== See also ==
- List of Adolf Hitler books
