= Adolf Hitler's private library =

Adolf Hitler personally owned an extensive collection of books (not including books he bought for the German state library). Nazi politician Baldur von Schirach claimed that Hitler had about 6,000 volumes and that he had read each one. Frederick Cable Oechsner estimated the collection at 16,300 volumes. No records exist to confirm the number, as several books were destroyed by the Allies.

Although contemporaries say that Hitler loved reading works by German authors, Friedrich Nietzsche in particular, according to Ambrus Miskolczy "there is no sign of Goethe, Schiller, Dante [sic], Schopenhauer, or Nietzsche in his library" (although it is possible that some of these could have been destroyed by Allied bombing). He is said to have believed that William Shakespeare was far superior to Goethe and Schiller. He had a copy of Georg Müller's 1925 translation of Shakespeare's collected works, and was fond of quoting certain lines throughout his life. According to Timothy Ryback, his collection is said to have included "first editions of works by philosophers, historians, poets, playwrights, and novelists." He owned illustrated copies of Don Quixote and Robinson Crusoe, which he ranked—along with Gulliver's Travels and Uncle Tom's Cabin—as the great works of world literature. Hitler was a voracious reader; he claimed to read at least one book a night, if not more. He was also given books as gifts by the wives of his friends and colleagues. According to Miskolczy, "The only outstanding classical literary text found in his library today is the collected writings of Kleist."

== History ==
Following the war, Hitler's private books were confiscated by the Soviets and sent to Moscow. Books in Munich and Berchtesgaden (as well as Hitler's Globe from Berchtesgaden) were taken as war booty by individual U.S. soldiers. Three thousand volumes were later discovered in a Berchtesgaden salt mine, and they were taken by the United States Library of Congress. The largest volume that has been recovered is about the German colonies, with a dedication written to Hitler, encouraging the "re-acquisition of the colonies". They are now in a special locked room in the Library of Congress where they can be accessed five at a time and read in the rare-book reading room. Eighty books that had belonged to Hitler were identified in the basement of Brown University, Providence, Rhode Island.
