= Académie Diplomatique Internationale =

France-based think tank

- Abbreviation: ADI
- Formation: 1926
- Type: Public policy think tank
- Headquarters: 4 Avenue Hoche
- Location: Paris
- President: Aga Khan IV
- Website: academiediplomatique.org

The Académie Diplomatique Internationale (ADI; English: International Diplomatic Academy) was an international organization based in Paris, France, focused on modern diplomacy and international affairs. Founded in 1926, the ADI was, along with Chatham House in London and the Council on Foreign Relations in New York, one of the first policy institutions devoted to the sustained study and analysis of international relations. Early members included Aristide Briand, Nicolae Titulescu, Gustav Stresemann, and Franklin D. Roosevelt. Under the Presidency of His Highness the Aga Khan IV, who was elected in 2000, the ADI has focused its efforts on diplomatic training and emerging dynamics in international relations and modern diplomacy.

== Mission ==
The Académie Diplomatique Internationale is an institution dedicated to advancing modern diplomacy and contributing to the understanding and analysis of emerging dynamics in international affairs. In recognition of the impact of globalization, the ADI engages not only the traditional diplomatic and foreign policy communities, but also new actors like multilateral institutions, corporations, advocacy groups, and others involved in shaping regional and international dynamics. In exercising its mission, the ADI draws upon its decades-long engagement in international relations-and upon an unparalleled network of global contacts-to match expertise and capacities among professionals from the public, private and independent sectors. “We have no connection with any Government and we have no desire to impose our will on anyone,” the first ADI president observed. “But from unofficial and independent research of this character much help will be given to the cause of peace.” These are the ADI's founding values and remain its enduring goals.

== Recent history ==
Since the year 2000, when His Highness the Aga Khan was elected president, the ADI has undertaken a major renovation of its historic residence and a strategic realignment of its mission and programmatic activities with a focus on modern diplomacy. In 2007, Jean-Claude Cousseran was appointed Secretary-General of the ADI and Timothy W. Ryback, the former Vice-President of the Salzburg Seminar, became the Deputy Secretary-General.

In 2008, the ADI, in partnership with the International Herald Tribune created the Forum for New Diplomacy, a speaker series focused on the dynamics of new diplomacy. The Forum features a prominent speaker in conversation with Roger Cohen or other International Herald Tribune writers. Speakers have included Bernard Kouchner, Kofi Annan, Mohammed ElBaradei, David Petraeus, and Jean-Claude Trichet. The Women in Power series, inaugurated in 2010, has featured Ellen Johnson Sirleaf and Christine Lagarde.

The Academy stopped operating after 82 years, at the end of June 2018.
