= Hitler's Letters and Notes =

Book by Werner Maser

Hitler's Letters and Notes is a book by Werner Maser. It is a collection of Adolf Hitler’s personal correspondence and private notations with comments by Maser. It reproduces photo-facsimiles of the handwritten original documents, with translations thereof, from the age of 17 until his death. Maser contends that the book casts new light onto the development of Hitler's political philosophy.

It was first published in German as Hitlers Briefe und Notizen: sein Weltbild in handschriftlichen Dokumenten in 1973. Heinemann (London) published a slightly adapted translation (by Arnold Pomerans) as a 390-page hardcover in 1974, followed by Harper & Row in the United States. Bantam Books released a paperback version in 1976.

== See also ==
- List of Adolf Hitler books
