= David Abraham (historian) =

American legal scholar and historian

- Born: November 9, 1946 (age 79); Antwerp, Belgium
- Citizenship: American
- Occupations: Legal scholar, historian, professor
- Employer: University of Miami School of Law

Academic work
- Notable works: The Collapse of the Weimar Republic: Political Economy and Crisis; Wer gehört zu uns? Who Belongs to “Us”

David Abraham (born November 9, 1946) is an American legal scholar, historian, and Professor Emeritus of Law at the University of Miami. His research focuses on labor law, political economy, immigration, and citizenship.

== Early life and education ==
Abraham was born in Antwerp, Belgium, to Auschwitz and slave-labor survivor parents. His family immigrated to the United States, settling in the Bronx, Buffalo, and Brooklyn. Raised in orthodox and Zionist circles, he was also an advocate for progressive social policies.

He earned a Bachelor of Arts in General Studies in the Social Sciences from the University of Chicago in 1968. During his undergraduate years, he was involved in antiwar and new left politics. He later obtained a Master of Arts in History (1972) and a Ph.D. in History (1977) from the University of Chicago. From 1970 to 1971, he studied at the Hebrew University of Jerusalem, where he was influenced by Jacob Talmon.

Abraham later attended the University of Pennsylvania Law School, earning his J.D. in 1989. He received the M.H. Goldstein Memorial Prize in Labor Law and served as an editor of the University of Pennsylvania Law Review.

== Career ==
Abraham taught German and European history at Princeton University from 1977 to 1985. After transitioning to law, he clerked for Judge Leonard Garth of the United States Court of Appeals for the Third Circuit from 1989 to 1990 and then worked as an associate at Simpson Thacher & Bartlett in New York City.

In 1991, he joined the faculty at the University of Miami School of Law, becoming a full Professor in 1996 and later Professor Emeritus. He has taught courses in Labor and Employment Law, Property Law, Immigration Law, and Jurisprudence and Political Theory. He has also lectured internationally at institutions such as the University of Tübingen, Deakin University, the Jena Center for 20th Century History, and the University of Ulster.In addition to several professional organizations, Abraham is active in Israel-Palestine work and is on the regional and national executive boards of Partners for a Progressive Israel and JSt as well as working in Standing Together and If Not Now.

== Research and publications ==
Abraham's research focuses on law, history, and political economy. His seminal work, The Collapse of the Weimar Republic: Political Economy and Crisis, explores the social-democratic efforts to establish a welfare state in interwar Germany and how elite interests contributed to the rise of the Nazis. Though widely accepted, his argument, rooted in neo-Marxism, faced criticism from some scholars, most notably Henry Ashby Turner. Drawing on Gramsci, Poulantzas, and the interwar socialist analysts, Abraham’s work stands in strong contrast to an ongoing apologetic conservative tradition.

He has published in journals such as Law and Social Inquiry, Politics & Society, American Journal of Legal History, Citizenship Studies, and the International Journal of Constitutional Law. His most recent book, Wer gehört zu uns? Who Belongs to “Us” (2019), examines immigration, integration, and solidarity in the welfare state.

=== Selected publications ===
==== Books ====
- Wer gehört zu uns? Who Belongs to “Us” (2019)
- The Collapse of the Weimar Republic: Political Economy and Crisis (1981, 1986, 2025)

==== Articles and chapters ====
- "Group Rights and Individual Minority Rights in Immigrant Societies, Then and Now," Immigrants and Minorities (2022)
- "Law and Migration," in Migration Theory: Talking across the Disciplines (2021)
- "Citizenship and Justice: Comments on Dimitry Kochenov’s Citizenship," International Journal of Constitutional Law (2021)
- "Class, Identity and ‘We the People’," VerfBlog (2020)

==== Book reviews ====
- Dreamland: America’s Immigration Lottery in an Age of Restriction, by Carly Goodman (2023)
- Paradigm Lost: From Two-State Solution to One State Reality, by Ian Lustick (2021)

== Awards and fellowships ==
- Distinguished Senior Fellow, City University of New York (2019)
- Daniel E. Murray Distinguished Service Award, University of Miami School of Law (2015)
- German Academic Exchange Service (DAAD) Research Award (2015)
- American Political Science Association Best Book Chapter of the Year in Migration and Citizenship (2014)
- Bosch Berlin Prize Fellow, American Academy in Berlin (2010)
- "Golden Apple" Teacher of the Year Award, University of Miami School of Law (2003-04)
- Alexander von Humboldt awards (1982, 2021)
