= The Rome–Berlin Axis =

Book by Elizabeth Wiskemann

- 1966 revised edition
- Author: Elizabeth Wiskemann
- Language: English
- Genre: Non-fiction
- Publisher: Oxford University Press
- Publication date: 1949
- Publication place: United Kingdom
- Media type: Print (hardcover)

The Rome-Berlin Axis is a 1949 book by British historian Elizabeth Wiskemann. It is a study of the Axis alliance between Fascist Italy and Nazi Germany, with particular emphasis on the relationship between Benito Mussolini and Adolf Hitler. It was published by Oxford University Press as a 376-page hardcover, in 1949 (after the war). In 1966, Collins (London) published a 446-page revised edition.

== Focus ==
The book focuses on the background and the personalities of Mussolini and Hitler. The most crucial aspect is the will of Hitler partnered with Mussolini to overcome another possible German isolation and later be able to conduct military operations through the Balkans and replace Italy; nevertheless, the matter never resolved of the German minority in South Tirol (and the consequent Italianization promoted by Rome). This began a progressive deterioration of the collaborations between Germany and Italy which ended in an enslavement of Italian Social Republic by the Nazis.

== Style ==
The author utilizes diplomatic documents from Italy, Germany and Great Britain and various memories such as those of Galeazzo Ciano, Filippo Anfuso, Rudolf Rahn. The author describes history following a chronological order of the events to demonstrate the development of the relationships which led to the formation of the Axis and the outbreak of the war.

== Structure ==
The book includes in its fifteen chapters the background and the personal life of the Hitler and Mussolini, their relations under different events like the Second Italo-Ethiopian War, Spanish Civil War, Austria Anschluss, the diplomatic missions of Mussolini in Germany and Hitler in Italy, the Munich crisis, the Pact of Steel, the outbreak of the war and the alliance during the war since the fall of the regimes.

== Reviews ==
Raimond J. Sontag judges this book as a good historical study of the negative period, the different personalities of the dictators and how their background influenced the developing their future agendas (Mussolini was a journalist and Hitler was an abnormal adolescent).

Martin Wight analyzes how the alliance between Italy and Germany got influenced by the personalities of the two dictators. Before the war Mussolini started a campaign of Italianization through all the regions close the boundaries eventually changing his political view after Hitler came to power. During the war and the following the armistice of Italy it became clear that the territories occupied by the Nazis (especially in the northern borders) discovered a renewed anti-Italian sentiment declaring de facto a complete deprivation of power of Mussolini.

== Criticism ==
The book describes the two dictators as originating under Nietzsche's culture, but the Nazism that originated from Hitler's Mein Kampf which turned to be a culture destroying medium promoting racism especially against Jews and other minorities. Mussolini and Fascism were born in a different historical context. The translation of the book itself is often inaccurate and the unpublished sources are not always clear and defined.

== See also ==
- Bibliography of Adolf Hitler

== Citations ==
- Raymond J. Sontag in American Historical Review Vol. 55, No. 1 (Oct., 1949), pp. 139–140.
- Martin Wight in International Affairs, Vol. 25, No. 3 (Jul., 1949), pp. 370–371.
- Martin Wight in International Affairs, Vol. 25, No. 3 (Jul., 1949), pp. 370–371.
