= Unmasked: Two Confidential Interviews with Hitler in 1931 =

1968 book by Richard Breiting

- Editor: Richard Breiting
- Original title: Ohne Maske
- Translator: Richard H. Barry
- Language: German
- Publisher: Chatto & Windus
- Publication date: 1968
- ISBN: 0-701-11642-0
- Dewey Decimal: 943.085
- LC Class: DD247.H5 C3213

Unmasked: Two Confidential Interviews with Hitler in 1931 is a book first published in 1968 claiming to comprise transcripts of shorthand notes by Richard Breiting of two confidential 1931 interviews with Adolf Hitler. In addition the book has an essay (in the form of an epilogue) by Edouard Calic entitled "The Anatomy of Demagogy and Adolf Hitler's Bent for Destruction"; a set of comprehensive notes also by Calic and a foreword by Golo Mann. The authenticity of the transcripts has been challenged.

== Publication ==
First published in German in 1968 with the title Ohne Maske, the book was translated by Richard H Barry and published by Chatto & Windus in 1971.

== Importance ==
Calic considers that during the confidential interviews with Breitling, Hitler:

…unfolded like a panorama all that in his speeches remained concealed behind phrases and gestures, things not even hinted at in Mein Kampf, the subterfuges and methods of achieving power, the technique of the legal coup d’état to establish total domination over Germany, the brutal extension of his tyranny over all Europe from the Atlantic to the Urals and the megalomaniac vision of world domination.

== Background to the interviews ==
Hitler's confidential 1931 interviews were with Richard Breiting, editor-in-chief of the Leipziger Neueste Nachrichten, a newspaper published by Edgar Herfurth representing the views and policies of Germany's 'conservative Right'. Breiting himself was a member of the German People's Party (Deutsche Volkspartei, or DVP) whilst the Hugenberg Press (owned by the German National People's Party (DNVP) Chairman Alfred Hugenberg, the country's leading media proprietor) had an interest in the Leipziger Neueste Nachrichten.

Breiting was well-connected with the conservative Right and Calic believes Hitler wished to "win over" this influential press editor. There was also a tangible issue to be dealt with in that a Dresden-based NSDAP newspaper, Freiheitskampf (which had been founded in 1930), had been attacking Breiting and Herfurth in its editorials, leading to complaints to Hitler.

Calic states that Otto Dietrich (who became Hitler's press chief on 1 August 1931) had been Breiting's Munich correspondent between 1928 and 1930 and facilitated the granting of an interview by Hitler.

Although Hitler gave his permission for Breiting to take shorthand notes, both Hitler and Hess stressed the strictly confidential nature of the discussions. Breiting nevertheless briefed Herfurth on the meetings, and in addition made the DNVP's Chairman Hugenberg and its parliamentary floor-leader Ernst Oberfohren aware of the discussions.

== First interview: Monday 4 May 1931 ==
The meeting lasted three hours.

=== Location and attendees ===
According to Breiting's shorthand notes, the interview took place at the Brown House, the NSDAP national headquarters located at 45 Brienner Straße in Munich. Breiting was accompanied by Alfred Detig, a member of the editorial staff of the newspaper. The pair were received by Rudolf Hess, who entertained them while they waited an hour before being admitted to Hitler's presence.

=== Topics ===
In the first interview Hitler explained his plan for taking control of the German state by legal means and the Gleichschaltung that would follow.

== Second interview: possibly early June 1931 ==
Calic has speculated that the first page of the original shorthand text is lost.

=== Date and location unclear ===
Breiting's notes indicate that the second meeting assembled at 10:00 am and finished at 12:45pm. However, there is nothing to indicate when or where the interview took place. Calic dates it as being in early June, relying on a remark by Hitler during the interview: "as I told you a month ago." Calic also states that it may be assumed that the meeting took place in the same place as the previous one.

Hitler's usage of time seems vague however, for elsewhere in the interview transcript he is also quoted as saying: "When I celebrated my 42nd birthday a few weeks ago..." In early June Hitler's birthday (on 20 April) would have been some 6 weeks previously. That it did take place approximately a month after the first interview is nevertheless supported by another remark by Hitler during the interview: "Three months ago, in February 1931..."

During this period it known from documentation that Hitler gave three speeches in Frankfurt an der Oder, 600 km north east of Munich on 31 May (and depending on how he travelled, his route may have taken him via Leipzig), that he was back in Munich by at least June 3 to give a speech at the Bürgerbräukeller, and that he gave two speeches in Chemnitz, 375 km north-east of Munich and about 65 km south-east of Breitner's Leipzig workplace, on June 7.

=== Attendees ===
The meeting between Breiting and Hitler was also attended once again by Rudolf Hess and for part of it (in respect of the quarrel with the Freiheitskampf) by the NSDAP's Lawyer Hans Frank.

=== Topics ===
In the second interview Hitler explained his strategy for achieving a new world order with Germany colonising the East after the destruction of the Soviet Union.

== Events afterwards ==
Calic states that as a result of an indiscretion it became known that Breiting had made a summary for Herfurth. When knowledge of the meeting spread to Joseph Goebbels and Max Amann, concerns about the existence of the notes mounted. On 18 February 1934 the Leipzig Gestapo demanded the return of the notes. Breiting denied that they still existed, saying that he had destroyed them. He had in fact hidden all his personal papers in a location near Hamburg with his sister.

Breiting applied for, but was refused, membership of the NSDAP and came under suspicion. He then died in 1937, about which Calic writes:

On 19 April 1937 Breiting was summoned to the Reich Ministry of Propaganda in Berlin, where two Gestapo agents took him to a restaurant for a talk. Although he was only 54 and had hitherto been in good health, he returned to Leipzig racked with convulsions and a nervous fever. According to his family he was convinced that he had been poisoned. A week later he was dead. Though the family requested an autopsy, the doctor in charge refused. His body was cremated without his family's knowledge.

== Authenticity ==
Calic states that the authenticity of the documents have been confirmed by the opinions of:

- Karl Dietrich Bracher
- Harold C. Deutsch
- Emil Dovifat
- Sebastian Haffner
- Walther Hofer
- Robert Kempner
- Eugen Kogan
- Karl Lange (de)
- Wolfgang Malanowski
- Golo Mann
- Wilhelm Ritter von Schramm
- Henry Ashby Turner jr
- Friedrich Zipfel

On the other hand, doubts have been expressed by Hugh Trevor-Roper, Hans Mommsen, Henning Köhler and Fritz Tobias. Rainer Zitelmann maintains that the documents have been proved to be forgeries.

== See also ==
- List of books by or about Adolf Hitler
- List of Adolf Hitler speeches
