= New diplomacy =

New diplomacy is international relations in which citizens play a greater role. Under the old diplomacy, global policymaking was more strictly the purview of governments. New diplomacy began to be observed in the 1990s amidst easing tensions in the wake of the Cold War and streamlined communication among activists in the burgeoning Internet age. New diplomacy is being used to address many issues such as human rights (e.g. the campaign to end South African apartheid and the Save Darfur campaign), humanitarian assistance, labor rights, environmental issues, and fair trade. Carne Ross, who resigned from the British Foreign Office following his country's participation in the 2003 invasion of Iraq, wrote about this phenomenon in his book, Independent Diplomat.

In March 2008, the Académie Diplomatique Internationale and the International Herald Tribune created the Forum for New Diplomacy featuring leading figures in politics, business and civil society in discussion with senior editors and columnists from the International Herald Tribune and The New York Times about emerging dynamics in global affairs. The Forum provides an ongoing opportunity for exploring “new diplomacy” with a particular emphasis on innovative approaches to effecting change in international relations.

== See also ==
- Cultural diplomacy
- Science diplomacy
