= Unmasking =

Unmasking may refer to:

- Unmasking, the process of consciously giving up on autistic masking
- The Unmasking, a 1914 film
- Binaural unmasking, a phenomenon in auditory perception
- Unmasking by U.S. intelligence agencies

== See also ==
- Unmasked (disambiguation)
