= Hitler: Memoirs of a Confidant =

Book by Otto Wagener

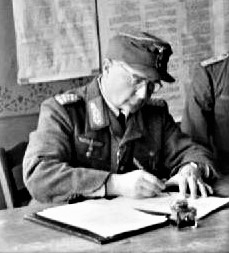
Wagener signing unconditional surrender papers in Rhodes in 1945

Hitler: Memoirs of a Confidant are the published memoirs of Otto Wagener about Adolf Hitler and the Nazi Party's early history. A German major general by the end for World War II, Wagener was, for a period, Hitler's party economist, chief of staff of the SA, and personal confidant. His career was derailed by rival Hermann Göring.

Wagener wrote his memoirs in 1946 while being held by the British, filling “thirty-six British military exercise notebooks.” His work was not published until seven years after his death, in 1978 in German. An English edition, in which passages that aren't directly concerned with Hitler are replaced with brief summaries, was published in 1985 by Yale University Press. His memoirs are used by historians of Nazi Germany for insights into its early history.

Wagener’s memoirs were first published in Germany under the title Hitler aus nächster Nähe: Aufzeichnungen eines Vertrauten 1929-1932 ("Hitler Up Close: Notes from a Confidant 1929-1932"), but was somewhat abbreviated in the 1985 English version which was edited by Henry Ashby Turner, Jr. and translated by Ruth Hein.

== Narrative ==
The book was considered to be different from most memoirs written by Hitler's confidants because of the hostility of those memoirs towards Hitler in later years. Wagener never rejected or was adversarial to Hitler, appearing to show an “unbroken faith in Hitler” as if he were "in contact with a demigod." Since Wagener was a close associate of Hitler from 1929 to 1933 his memoirs have provided historians with invaluable information about Hitler and the National Socialist movement before they had come to power. For instance, during intense debates in 1931 and 1932 over how Hitler should oversee the German economy, Wagener revealed his attempts "to persuade Hitler to abandon economic liberalism and follow a socialist-corporatist line."

When Hitler bid Otto Wagener farewell in early 1933, he swore him to "hermetic silence," declaring: "During so many nights we discussed... so many things, and I have revealed to you... my innermost thoughts and my most fundamental ideas, as I have done perhaps to no one else. Please keep this knowledge to yourself and thus become the guardian of the grail whose inmost truth can be disclosed only to a few."

== Reception ==
In 1979, David Schoenbaum described Hitler: Memoirs of a Confidant as "a remarkable book. Lucid, candid, and discursive, it is ultimately a monument of instructive inadvertence." He deemed it a better source on the workings of the Nazi Party than the books by Hermann Rauschning, Albert Speer, and Albert Krebs. Schoenbaum argued that in the book, Hitler emerges as "windy, cunning, fanatic, pretentious, and predatory, despite Wagener's sporadic efforts to deodorize his memory." In 1985, Fritz Stern wrote that the memoirs "constitute an important source concerning Hitler's private life and political style, his self-assessment and his considerable pseudo-learning. [...] mostly it is a record of often manipulative conversations that confirm received opinion about Hitler".

In 1988, Peter Stachura stated that the memoirs "undoubtedly constitute a valuable source for the early history of National Socialism". He wrote that Wagener deals with "the important question of the development of economic ideas" in the party in 1931–32, and that some of Hitler's lesser-known opinions are discussed. Jill Stephenson praised Turner's editing, arguing that Turner "[gives] a greater insight into his character".

Gordon A. Craig, writing in The New York Times, found Wagener’s book a story that “comes powerfully to mind”, writing:

Historians are not oversupplied with source materials on the years immediately before Hitler's accession to power in 1933, and despite its weaknesses, this record tells us a good deal we did not know about currents of thought, unresolved issues and conflicts of personality within the Nazi party during these critical years.

A less favorable Hans A. Schmitt argued that the book failed to illuminate the private Hitler. Schmitt claimed that choices made by Germany after the conversations had rendered certain conversations quite irrelevant. Schmitt did say that some "mind-boggling" views are revealed, such as Hitler's advocacy of Zionism on the grounds that keeping Jews in one state would break their world power. R. Z. Sheppard wrote in Time magazine:

We've grown accustomed to his faces: Hitler the buffoon, Hitler the madman, Hitler the monster. Memoirs of a Confidant introduces us to Hitler the misunderstood idealist whose vision of peace and prosperity was distorted by his gangster lieutenants. The author of this benign nonsense was Otto Wagener, a forgotten Nazi who served as storm trooper chief of staff and party economist until his career was derailed by Rival Hermann Göring.
