= Seboncourt =

- Commune
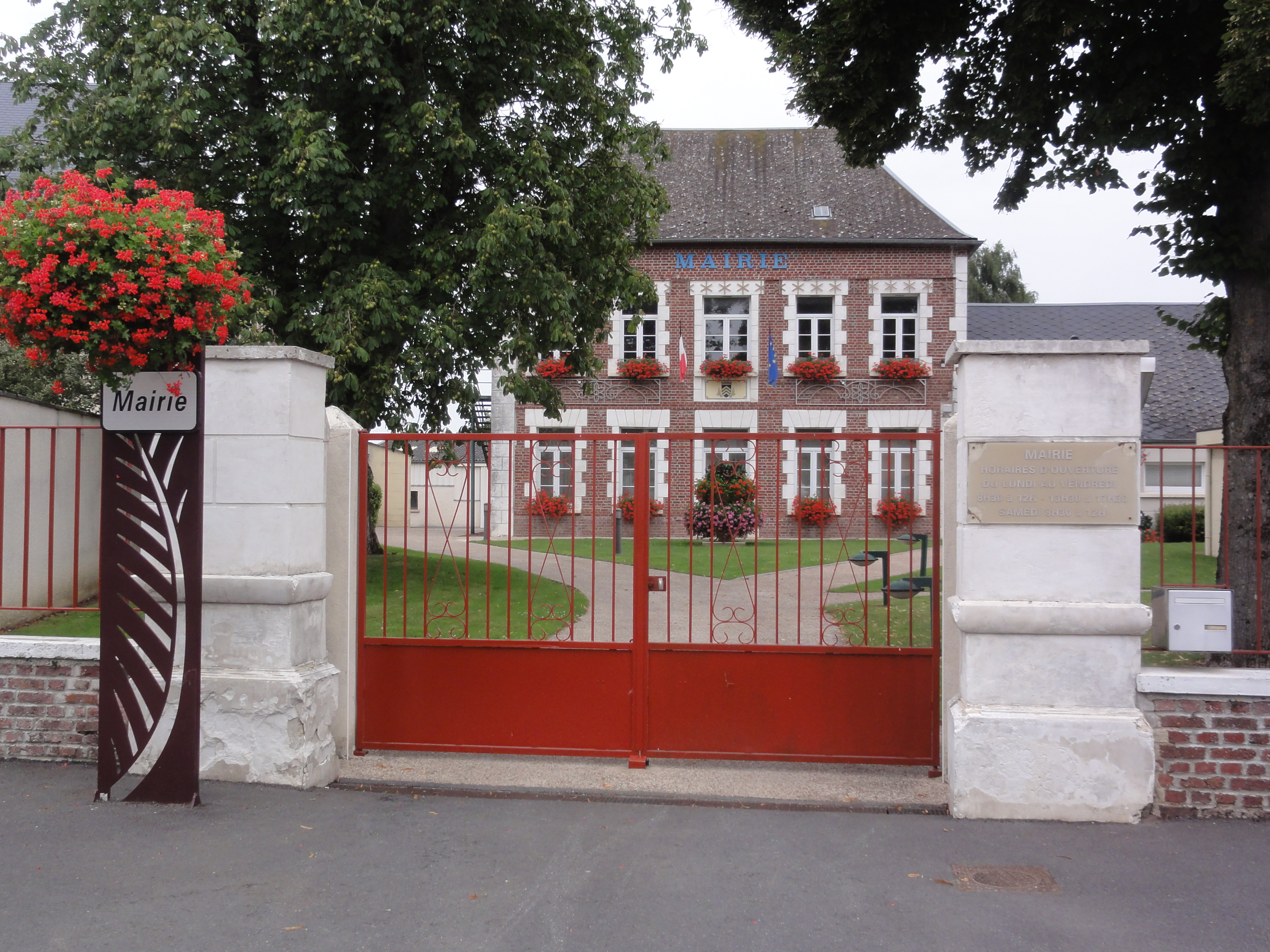
- The town hall of Seboncourt

- Coat of arms
- Location of Seboncourt
- Location within France Location within Hauts-de-France
- Coordinates: 49°57′18″N 3°28′50″E
- Country: France
- Region: Hauts-de-France
- Department: Aisne
- Arrondissement: Saint-Quentin
- Canton: Bohain-en-Vermandois
- Intercommunality: Pays du Vermandois

Government
  - Mayor (2026–32): Hugues Legrand
- Area^{1}: 11.79 km^{2} (4.55 sq mi)
- Elevation: 154 m (505 ft)
- Highest elevation: 166 m (545 ft)
- Lowest elevation: 128 m (420 ft)
- Population (2023): 1,087
  - Density: 92.20/km^{2} (238.8/sq mi)
- Time zone: UTC+01:00 (CET)
  - Summer (DST): UTC+02:00 (CEST)
- INSEE/Postal code: 02703 /02110
- ^{1} French Land Register data, which excludes lakes, ponds, glaciers > 1 km^{2} (0.386 sq mi or 247 acres) and river estuaries.

Seboncourt (French pronunciation: [səbɔ̃kuʁ]) is a commune in the Aisne department in Hauts-de-France in northern France.

== Population ==
Historical population
Year	Pop.	±% p.a.
1968	1,165	—
1975	1,108	−0.71%
1982	1,119	+0.14%
1990	1,135	+0.18%
1999	1,142	+0.07%
2007	1,066	−0.86%
2012	1,098	+0.59%
2017	1,097	−0.02%
2023	1,087	−0.15%
Source: INSEE

== See also ==
- Communes of the Aisne department
