= Hitler's Thirty Days to Power =

- Cover of the first edition
- Author: Henry Ashby Turner, Jr.
- Cover artist: Robert Dietz
- Language: English
- Subject: Adolf Hitler
- Published: 1996 (Addison-Wesley)
- Publication place: United States
- Media type: Print
- ISBN: 9780201407143
- OCLC: 34753374
- Dewey Decimal: 943.085
- LC Class: DD247.H5T79

Hitler's Thirty Days to Power is a 1996 history book by historian and Yale professor Henry Ashby Turner. The book covers political events in Germany during the month of January 1933, which culminated in the appointment of Adolf Hitler as chancellor on January 30.

In Hitler's Thirty Days to Power, Turner concludes that Hitler's rise was not inevitable, but that the end of the Weimar democracy probably was: Turner speculates that by 1933 the likely alternative to Hitler was a Kurt von Schleicher-led military regime, which Turner believes would have confined its territorial ambitions to the recovery of the Polish Corridor, leading to a limited German-Polish conflict but not a general European war – an unfolding of events where, in Mark Grimsley's characterization of Turner's conclusions, "Adolf Hitler would have become a mere footnote in history".

The book was reviewed by many important publications, including Foreign Affairs (by Stanley Hoffmann), The Times Literary Supplement, Booklist, The New York Review of Books (by Gordon A. Craig), Kirkus Reviews, History and Theory and other publications. Historian and Hitler biographer Alan Bullock called Hitler's Thirty Days to Power "[T]he best and fullest account of the 'make or break' month of January 1933".

== Editions ==
- Turner, Henry Ashby (1996). Hitler's Thirty Days to Power. Boston: Addison-Wesley. ISBN 978-0201407143. (Hardcover)
- Turner, Henry Ashby (1996). Hitler's Thirty Days to Power. London: Bloomsbury. ISBN 978-0747530046. (Hardcover)
- Turner, Henry Ashby (1997). Hitler's Thirty Days to Power. New York: Basic Books. ISBN 978-0201328004. (Paperback)
- Turner, Henry Ashby (2003). Hitler's Thirty Days to Power. Castle Books. ISBN 978-0785816850. (Hardcover)
