= Journal of the Royal College of Physicians of Edinburgh =

- Discipline: Clinical medicine, medical education, history of medicine
- Language: English
- Edited by: V. Ravindran

Publication details
- Former names: Proceedings of the Royal College of Physicians of Edinburgh, Chronicle (Royal College of Physicians of Edinburgh)
- History: 1971-2025
- Publisher: Royal College of Physicians of Edinburgh (Scotland)
- Frequency: Quarterly
- Open access: Yes

Standard abbreviations
- ISO 4: J. R. Coll. Physicians Edinb.

Indexing
- ISSN: 1478-2715 (print); 2042-8189 (web)
- OCLC no.: 240897647
- Proceedings of the Royal College of Physicians of Edinburgh
- ISSN: 0953-0932
- Chronicle (Royal College of Physicians of Edinburgh)
- ISSN: 0268-0688

Links
- Journal homepage; Online archive

The Journal of the Royal College of Physicians of Edinburgh is a peer-reviewed medical journal covering research in clinical medicine, medical education, and the history of medicine, published by the Royal College of Physicians of Edinburgh. It was established in 1971 as Chronicle (Royal College of Physicians of Edinburgh), renamed in 1988 to Proceedings of the Royal College of Physicians of Edinburgh, and obtained its current title in 2002. In December 2025, the journal published its last issue and is now closed.
