= Werner Maser =

German historian (1922–2007)

Werner Maser (12 July 1922, Paradeningken – 5 April 2007) was a German historian, journalist and professor at the Martin Luther University Halle-Wittenberg. Maser was the first historian to claim that the Hitler Diaries were forgeries.

He was born in Paradeningken (then part of East Prussia, and now within Kaliningrad Oblast, Russia) to a farmer and horse breeder. During the Second World War he served in the German Army as an infantry officer. After Germany's defeat, Maser was interned by the Soviets in Sachsenhausen concentration camp. After his release, he studied theology, philosophy and political science at the Humboldt University of Berlin, the Ludwig-Maximilians-Universität München, and the University of Erlangen–Nuremberg. His doctoral thesis was titled The Organisation of the Führer Legend. Maser was appointed professor of history at the Ludwig-Maximilians-Universität München and he was also a guest professor at universities in America, Japan and Finland. He discovered Hitler's medical records, which had been thought lost.

During the late 1970s Maser claimed that Hitler had fathered a son (Jean-Marie Loret) with a French peasant dancer in 1918.

He was a critic of the works of Alan Bullock and Sebastian Haffner. In his 1994 work Der Wortbruch: Hitler, Stalin und der Zweite Weltkrieg ("The Broken Agreement: Hitler, Stalin and the Second World War"), Maser argued that the Soviets were preparing to invade Germany and that Hitler's invasion of the Soviet Union pre-empted the planned Soviet invasion of Germany by two weeks. He also wrote biographies of German politicians Friedrich Ebert, Paul von Hindenburg and Helmut Kohl.

Richard Breitman called Maser's biography of Adolf Hitler "the least reliable among the major biographies" and criticized Maser for giving credence to Hitler's alleged familiarity with many classics, preferring Robert G. L. Waite's depiction of Hitler as someone who "perused various sources for specific information to reinforce his own views".

In the 2022 re-edition of Brigitte Hamann's Hitlers Vienna: a Dictator's Apprenticeship multiple references to Maser's books can be found.

== Works ==
- Genossen beten nicht. Kirchenkampf des Kommunismus (Köln: Verlag für Wissenschaft und Politik, 1963).
- Die Frühgeschichte der NSDAP – Hitlers Weg bis 1924 (Frankfurt am Main, 1965); newer editions: Sturm auf die Republik (Stuttgart 1973; Düsseldorf 1994)
- Hitlers Mein Kampf: Entstehung, Aufbau, Stil, Änderungen, Quellen, Quellenwert, Kommentierte Auszüge (München: Bechtle-Verlag, 1966).
  - (English translation by Richard Barry), Hitler's Mein Kampf: An Analysis (London: Faber and Faber, 1970).
- Adolf Hitler: Legende, Mythos, Wirklichkeit (München: Bechtle-Verlag, 1971).
  - (English translation by Peter and Betty Ross), Hitler: Legend, Myth & Reality (New York: Harper & Row, 1973).
- Hitlers Briefe und Notizen. Sein Weltbild in Handschriftlichen Dokumenten (Düsseldorf and Vienna: Econ Verlag, 1973).
  - (English translation), Hitler's Letters and Notes (1973).
- Nürnberg. Tribunal der Sieger, Econ-Verlag, Düsseldorf-Wien (1977).
  - (English translation by Richard Barry), Nuremberg: A Nation on Trial (London: Allen Lane, 1979).
- Der Wortbruch. Hitler, Stalin und der Zweite Weltkrieg (München: Günter Olzog Verlag, 1994).
- Sturm auf die Republik. Düsseldorf 1994
