= David Lewis (psychologist) =

English neuropsychologist, author and lecturer

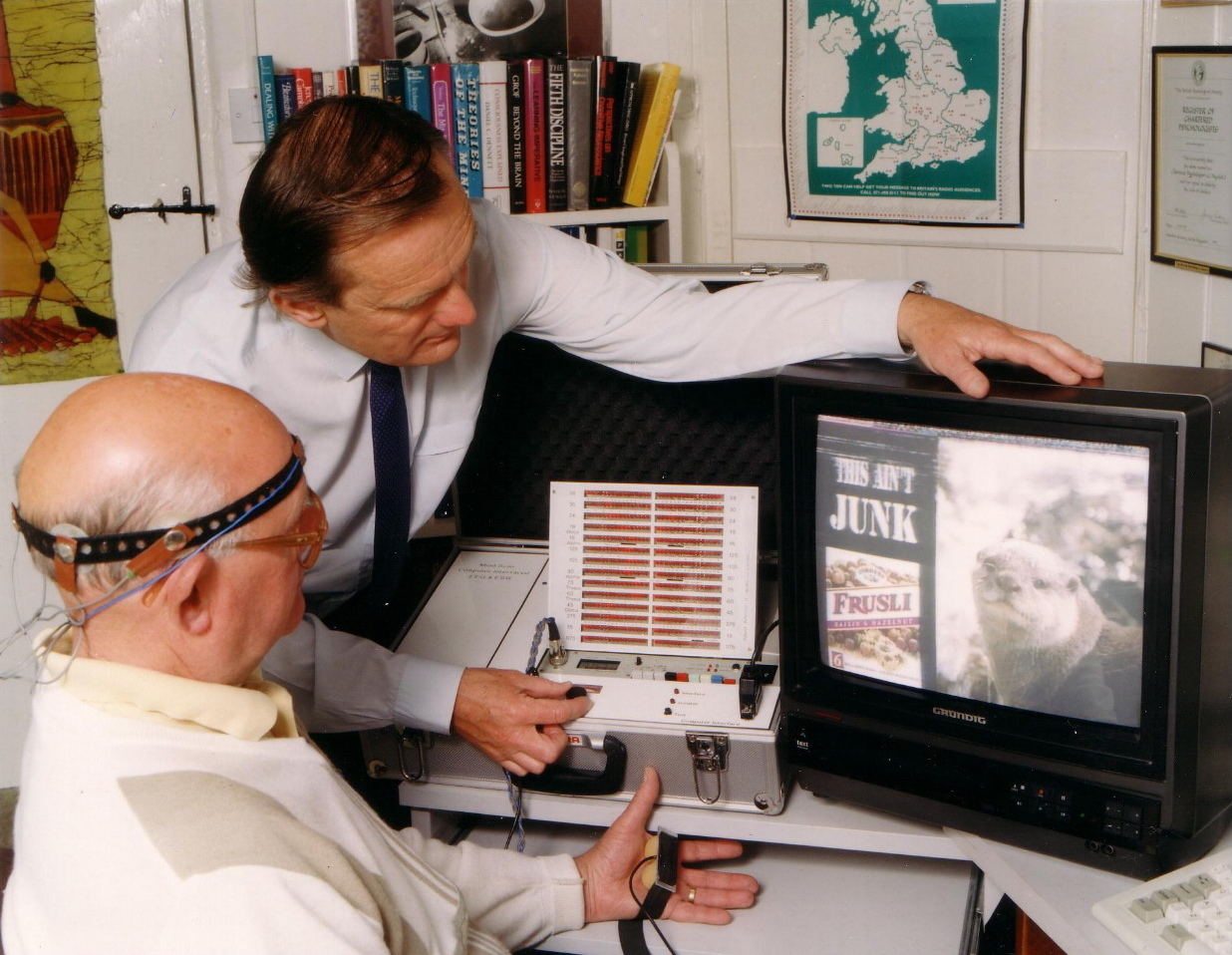
David Lewis measures a subject's responses to a TV commercial in the early 1980s using a specially modified version of the Mind Mirror the first non-medical EEG devise originally developed for neurofeedback by Geoffrey Blundell and Maxwell Cade

David Lewis (born 1942, died 2025) was an English neuropsychologist, author and lecturer.

He had a first-class honours degree in psychology and biology from the University of Westminster and a doctorate from the Department of Experimental Psychology at the University of Sussex, where he lectured in clinical psychology and psychopathology before setting up his own research organisation, Mindlab International, based at the Sussex Innovation Centre in Brighton.

== Bibliography ==
- The Secret Language of Your Child. How Children Talk Before they Can Speak, 1978. ISBN 0-285-62358-3.
- Thinking Better, (with James Greene) 1982. ISBN 0-89256-168-8
- Know Your Own Mind, (with James Green) 1983. ISBN 0-89256-265-X.
- Fight Your Phobia and Win, 1984 ISBN 0-85969-398-8.
- Loving and Loathing, 1985 ISBN 0-09-466250-9.
- The Alpha Plan, 1986. ISBN 0-413-59740-7.
- Mind Skills. Giving Your Child a Brighter Future, 1987. ISBN 0-586-20034-7.
- Helping Your Anxious Child, 1988. ISBN 0-413-17100-0.
- The Secret Language of Success. Using Body Language to Get What You Want, 1989. ISBN 963 04 9648 8.
- Heart Attack, 1990 ISBN 0-7225-3227-X
- Help Your Child Through School, 1992. ISBN 0091754356
- Information Overload. Practical Strategies for Surviving in Today's Workplace, 1999
- The Soul of the New Consumer: Authenticity What We Buy and Why in the New Economy, (with Darren Bridger) 2000 ISBN 1-85788-246-6
- The Man who invented Hitler, 2003. ISBN 0-7553-1148-5. New Ed edition (November 1, 2004), Publisher: Headline Book Publishing; ISBN 0-7553-1149-3. ISBN 978-0-7553-1149-1
- Pass That Exam, (DVD) 2002
- Mastering Your Memory, (DVD) 2007
- Impulse: Why We Do What We Do Without Knowing It, 2013. ISBN 1847946852
- Lewis, David (2019). Triumph of the Will? How Two Men Hypnotised Hitler and Changed the World. ISBN 978-1-5136-4140-9. OCLC 1102469313. Wikidata Q131748079.
