= Frederick Cable Oechsner =

American journalist and author

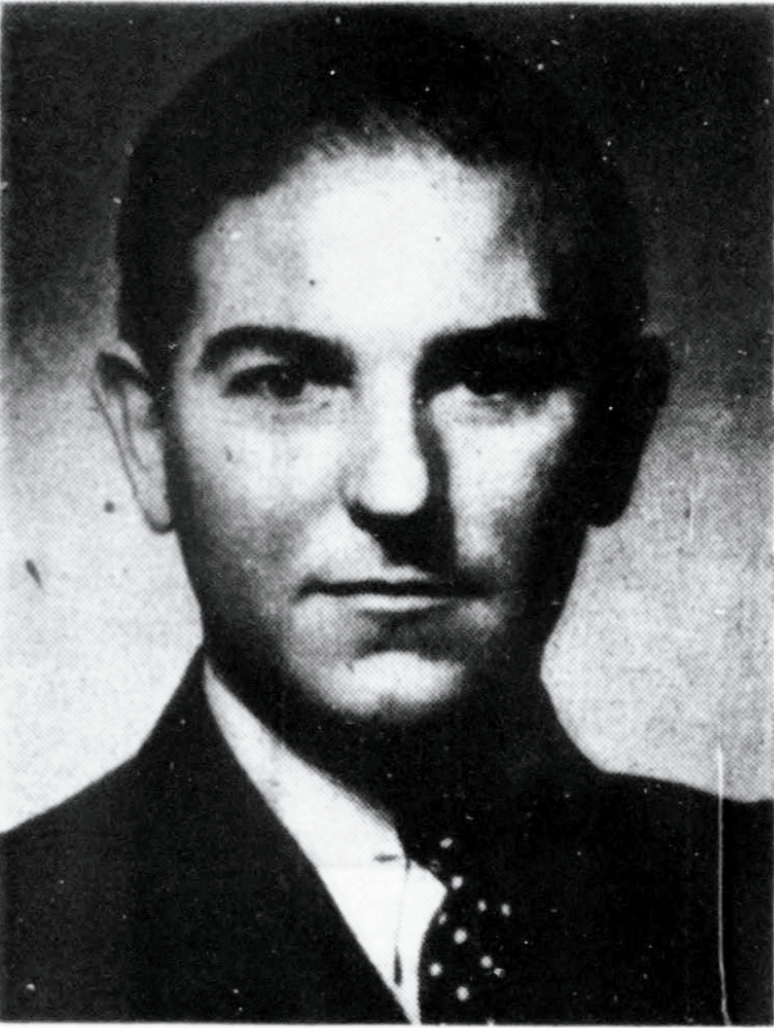
- Oechsner in 1945
- Born: November 26, 1902; New Orleans, Louisiana, US
- Died: April 21, 1992 (aged 89); New York City, N.Y., US
- Education: Williston Academy; Tulane University
- Occupations: Journalist, intelligence officer
- Employers: New Orleans Item-Tribune; The Evening Star; The Sun (New York City); United Press; C.I.A.
- Known for: Reporting from Nazi Germany (1929-1942)
- Notable work: This Is The Enemy (1942)
- Spouse: Marion Oechsner
- Parents: John Frederick Oechsner (farther); Caroline Kinne Oechsner, née Cable (mother)

Frederick Cable Oechsner (November 26, 1902 – April 21, 1992) was an American journalist known for his work as the Central European Manager of the United Press in Berlin before and during the World War II. He later served as an intelligence official under the Eisenhower administration. Oechsner was interned by the Germans along with the rest of the US Berlin press corps in 1941, until their release six months later in 1942.

== Early life and education ==
Oechsner was born to John Frederick and Caroline Kinne (Cable) Oechsner in New Orleans, Louisiana. He attended Williston Academy in Easthampton, Massachusetts, graduating in 1920. Following his return to New Orleans, Oechsner enrolled in Tulane University. He was admitted to the Louisiana Bar in 1925 but chose not to practice law. Instead, he joined the staff of The New Orleans Item as a reporter.

== Career in journalism ==
Oechsner began his journalism career as a reporter in New Orleans and Washington, D.C. During this time at The New Orleans Item, he worked as rewrite man, assistant city editor, drama editor, and music editor. In 1927, as The New Orleans Item reporter, Oechsner travelled to Guatemala to cover economic and political matters. As a foreign correspondent, he travelled from Guatemala to Italy and then to Paris.

Oechsner returned to the US in 1929 and joined the Washington D.C. Evening Star. In 1930 he returned to Europe and joined The Sun-Consolidated Press Foreign Service, with headquarters in Berlin.

=== United Press ===
When The Sun's press service ceased operations in 1932, Oechsner secured a position with the United Press staff in London. On May 1, 1933, he was appointed as the Berlin manager for the United Press. Oechsner remained the head of the United Press bureau in Berlin until 1942. On March 1, 1941, he was promoted to the position of Central European manager for the United Press, with headquarters in Berlin. This role expanded his responsibilities to overseeing a team of foreign correspondents across twelve European countries, including areas under Nazi occupation. His Berlin team included Howard K. Smith and Richard Helms, who later became the Director of the Central Intelligence Agency (CIA) (1965–1973).

In December 1941, Oechsner, along with the rest of the U.S. press corps in Berlin, was interned by German authorities in Bad Nauheim. They were detained alongside other American embassy staff and journalists. Among those interned were his United Press colleagues Joseph W. Grigg, Jack M. Fleischer, Glen M. Stadler, and Clinton B. Conger. In May 1942, Oechsner and the rest of the internees were released as part of a diplomatic exchange for German diplomats. Oechsner with his United Press colleagues co-authored the bestseller This Is The Enemy (1942), published by Little, Brown, which provided a critical examination of the Nazi regime.

After the publication of This Is the Enemy, Oeschner was recuited by William Donovan to join the Office of Strategic Services, where he was named head of a newly created Morale Operations branch, which organized propaganda operations against Germany After the war, Oechsner continued to work in intelligence.

== Post-World War II Intelligence work ==
After his service in the Office of Strategic Services, Oechsner was appointed as the director of psychological warfare under President Eisenhower. He continued to serve in intelligence services before retiring to Florida.

== Personal life ==
Oechsner was married to Marion and had two stepdaughters, Ann Bauer and Mary Bray Sharp, both residents of Orlando, Florida. He retired to Florida after a distinguished career in journalism and intelligence.
