= Otto Wagener =

German general and Nazi official (1888–1971)

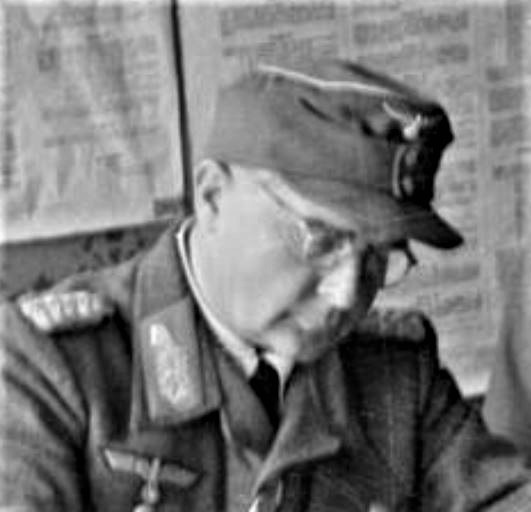
- Wagener signing the surrender document in Rhodes, 8 May 1945

SA-Stabschef
- In office 1 October 1929 – 31 December 1930
- Leader: Franz Pfeffer von Salomon
- Preceded by: Office established
- Succeeded by: Ernst Röhm

Reichskommissar for the Economy
- In office 24 April 1933 – 30 June 1933
- Preceded by: Office established
- Succeeded by: Wilhelm Keppler

Military Governor Italian Dodecanese Islands
- In office 20 July 1944 – 8 May 1945
- Preceded by: Office established
- Succeeded by: Office abolished

Additional positions
- 1933–1938: Reichstag Deputy

Personal details
- Born: Otto Wilhelm Heinrich Wagener; 29 April 1888 Durlach, Grand Duchy of Baden, German Empire
- Died: 9 August 1971 (aged 83) Chieming, Bavaria, West Germany
- Party: Nazi Party
- Education: Ph.D. (honorary)
- Alma mater: University of Würzburg
- Civilian awards: Nuremberg Party Day Badge

Military service
- Allegiance: German Empire; Nazi Germany
- Branch/service: Imperial German Army; Freikorps; German Army
- Years of service: 1906–1920; 1940–1945
- Rank: Hauptmann; Generalmajor
- Commands: Military Governor of the Italian Dodecanese
- Battles/wars: World War I World War II
- Military awards: Knight's Cross of the Iron Cross

Otto Wilhelm Heinrich Wagener (29 April 1888 – 9 August 1971) was a German professional military officer and Nazi Party official. He was a member of the Nazi paramilitary unit, the Sturmabteilung, rising to become its effective leader as the first SA-Stabschef from 1929 to 1930. At the start of the Nazi regime, he served as Adolf Hitler's chief economic advisor. He survived the Röhm purge of SA leaders in 1934 and returned to military service in the Second World War, becoming a Generalmajor and military governor of the Italian Dodecanese islands. Following the war, he was interned, put on trial in Italy and sentenced to prison for war crimes.

== Early life ==
A factory owner's son, Wagener was born in Durlach, was educated in the local Gymnasium and earned his Abitur in July 1906. He then entered the Imperial German Army as a Fahnenjunker (officer cadet) with the 111th (3rd Baden) Infantry Regiment. He was commissioned as a Leutnant in November 1907 and served as a battalion adjutant. He attended the Prussian Staff College between October 1913 and July 1914. On the outbreak of the First World War, he was deployed to the front with Reserve Infantry Regiment 55. He was promoted to Oberleutnant (November 1914) and Hauptmann (December 1915) serving as a brigade adjutant, a company commander and a battalion commander in Reserve Infantry Regiment 110. Beginning in July 1916, Wagener was assigned to the general staff of Army Group von Stein and of the 5th Army. He was awarded the Iron Cross, 1st and 2nd class but, in May 1918, he was dismissed from the army following a military court of honor.

After the war, Wagener became involved in a Freikorps unit operating on the Polish border. He also served in Courland as the chief of the general staff of the German Legion, a component of the Freikorps in the Baltic. He briefly assumed leadership of the Legion between November and December 1919 after its leader, Paul Siewert, was killed in action. After returning to Germany, he began to study economics but became involved with the Kapp Putsch and was briefly arrested. He was discharged from the Freikorps at the end of March 1920. In 1920 and 1921, he was the state leader in Baden of the Organization Escherich, an antisemitic paramilitary group. He worked as the assistant manager, then as the director and a board member at his father's sewing machine factory in Karlsruhe between 1920 and 1924. He continued his education, and was awarded an honorary doctorate from the University of Würzburg in 1924. He also lectured on economics in business courses at that university and at the Technische Hochschule Karlsruhe (today, the Karlsruhe Institute of Technology). Between 1924 and 1925, he traveled abroad lecturing on economic policy. Returning to Germany, he became the part-owner of a plywood and wood veneer company in Villingen for the next four years.

== Career in the SA ==
Wagener briefly was a member of the Sturmabteilung (SA) in 1923 before it was banned after Adolf Hitler's failed Beer Hall Putsch. He began to establish contacts with the Nazi Party in July 1929. He attended the Fourth Party Congress at a Nuremberg Rally in August, and was later awarded the Nuremberg Party Day Badge. On 1 October 1929, Wagener formally was accepted into the Party (membership number 159,203) and rejoined the SA, having been recruited by his old Freikorps comrade Franz Pfeffer von Salomon, then the Supreme SA Leader. Upon entering the SA, Wagener was appointed as the first SA-Stabschef. Pfeffer was seeking to build up a central staff structure and, as a former general staff officer, Wagener had the right credentials. Wagener also was able to put his business acumen and contacts to good use for the SA and for himself. He became a limited partner in a cigarette company and benefited financially from their joint business venture.

Wagener had used his business contacts to persuade a cigarette firm to produce "Sturm" cigarettes for SA men – a "sponsorship" deal benefiting both the firm and SA coffers. Stormtroopers were strongly encouraged to smoke only these cigarettes. A cut from the profit went to the SA …

When Pfeffer resigned on 29 August 1930 in the wake of the Stennes Revolt, Wagener assumed effective operational command of the SA for four months through 31 December 1930, until the assumption of command by Ernst Röhm as the new SA-Stabschef in early January 1931. (Note: After the first Stennes Revolt in August 1930, Hitler assumed Supreme Command of the SA, succeeding Wagener's friend and war comrade Pfeffer von Salomon as head of the SA. Wagener was the de facto leader of the SA from that time until Röhm's return on 5 January 1931. See Stennes Revolt.) In October 1930, Wagener expressed the expectation that the SA would form the manpower pool for the future national army following the envisioned Nazi takeover of the government. His views reflected the desire of the SA leadership for a high degree of autonomy from the political leadership that would continue to cause friction between the two and which would culminate in the Night of the Long Knives.

== Economic specialist ==
Despite his resignation as SA-Stabschef, Wagener's career continued to advance as he shifted his focus to the realm of economic policy. A member of the Party's Reichsleitung (national leadership) since October 1929, he was appointed the leader of its Economic Policy Department on 1 January 1931. Later that year, he was named editor of a Nazi economic journal, Wirtschaftpolitischen Briefe (Economic Policy Letters). On 18 December 1931, he was among the first group of officers to be promoted to the new rank of SA-Gruppenführer, and he joined Hitler's personal staff as his economic advisor on 4 September 1932.

By late 1930 or early 1931, Wagener already had made his mark on Nazi economic policy:

Wagener formulated an original set of economic policies based on corporatist and leadership principles in confidential talks with Hitler and succeeded in recruiting many middle echelon industrial managers and owners of small factories for the NSDAP … [A confidential draft by Wagener] embraced the ideal of the corporatist "company union" (Werksgemeinschaft) and described the employer as the "Führer" within his factory. All disputes over wages and working conditions would be settled within the "family" of the individual company in the National Socialist state of the future. Trade unions would be responsible merely for vocational training.

After the Nazi seizure of power on 30 January 1933, Wagener was appointed to a number of new economic portfolios. On 1 April, he was elevated to the leadership of the Economic Policy Main Office in the national Party leadership and was named the specialist for economic policy in the Party's government liaison staff. On 15 April, he was made a Regierungskommissar (government commissioner) for business management in the Reichsverband der Deutschen Industrie (Association of German Industry, RDI). On 24 April, Hitler appointed him Reichskommissar for the Economy. Finally, on 1 May, he was made Reichskommissar for the RDI and for all other sectors of the economy except agriculture.

Wagener became embroiled in disputes with leaders of industry during the process of Gleichschaltung (coordination), even forcibly occupying the RDI headquarters with the intention of shutting it down. Such heavy-handed tactics led to Wagener being replaced as Reichskommissar for the Economy by Wilhelm Keppler at the end of June 1933. Keppler was a long-term intermediary between the Party and leading industrialists who, unlike Wagener, enjoyed the trust of both sides. Further internal conflicts led to legal proceedings against Wagener in a case brought before the USCHLA (Supreme Party Court) and, on 13 July 1933, he was relieved of all his offices. However, at the November parliamentary election, Wagener was elected as a deputy to the Reichstag from electoral constituency 21 (Koblenz–Trier) and was reelected at the March 1936 election, serving until April 1938.

Following the Night of the Long Knives at the end of June 1934, when Röhm and much of the SA hierarchy was murdered, Wagener was arrested and detained for a short time, narrowly avoiding execution. He then went into a self-imposed isolation, working in agriculture near Wiesenbad in the Ore Mountains region of Saxony. After a few years, he managed to be successfully rehabilitated; he was reinstated in the SA at his former rank of SA-Gruppenführer on 1 April 1937, and was assigned to the staff at the SA Supreme Leadership.

== Second World War ==
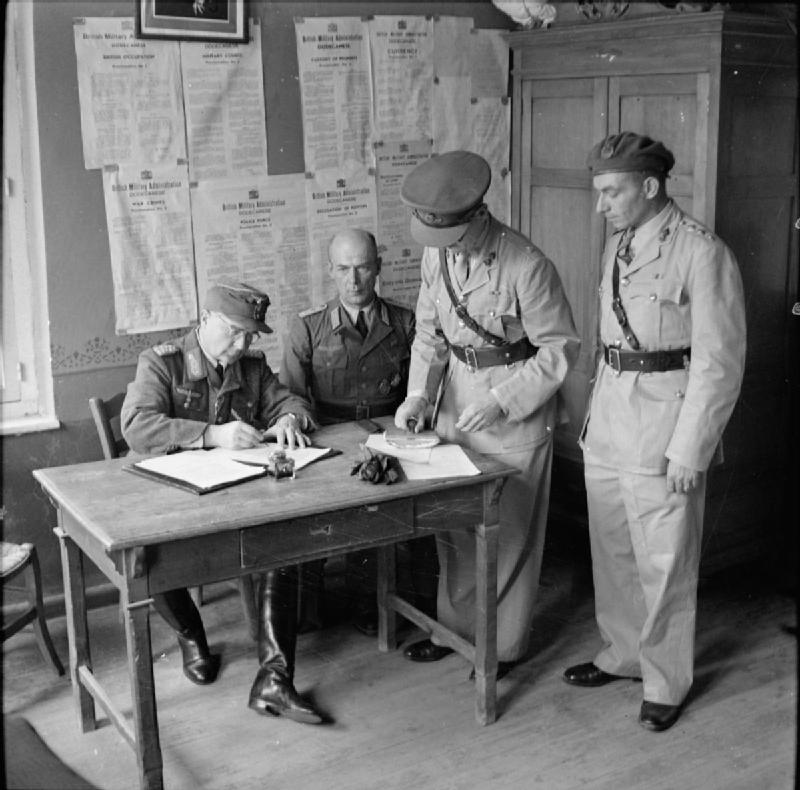
Wagener signs the instrument of surrender for the German forces in the Dodecanese to the British, 8 May 1945

During the Second World War, Wagener rejoined the military on 1 April 1940 with his former rank of Hauptmann, serving as an orderly officer at the 6th Army headquarters. In May, he was transferred to the general staff in the Army High Command and, in August, he was assigned as the general staff officer of the 332nd Infantry Regiment. He subsequently was promoted to Major (March 1941) and Oberstleutnant (June 1942). During the course of the war, he was awarded the Clasp to the Iron Cross, 1st and 2nd class. In January 1943, promoted to Oberst, he was named commander of Security Regiment 177 and, from 12 February 1944 to 6 May 1944, he advanced to become the commander of a Security Division.

Briefly placed into the Führerreserve, Wagener was reassigned on 20 July 1944 as the Commandant of the Eastern Aegean and the Military Governor of the Italian Dodecanese Islands, headquartered in Rhodes, and was promoted to Generalmajor on 1 December. Under his command, some 1,673 men, women and children – almost the entire Jewish population of Rhodes – were deported to Auschwitz where nearly all were murdered. Wagener also established internment camps and a concentration camp at Kallithea where Italian prisoners of war were incarcerated. He surrendered his command to British authorities on 8 May 1945, the same day as Germany's unconditional surrender.

== Post-war life and memoirs ==
Wagener was kept first in British custody at Island Farm in Bridgend, Wales and was transferred to the custody of Italian authorities on 1 July 1947. He was put on trial by Italy (Rome Territorial Military Tribunal) and was defended by the fascist lawyer Arconovaldo Bonaccorsi. On 16 October 1948, he was convicted and sentenced to fifteen years in prison for war crimes, including the execution of Italian prisoners of war and hostages. It was reported that over 1,300 death warrants were carried out in April and May 1945 alone. Due to the intercession of German Chancellor Konrad Adenauer and Austrian Bishop Alois Hudal, his sentence was commuted and he was released from prison on 4 June 1951.

Returning to Germany, Wagener became the chairman of the Seeckt Society and was involved with nationalist political circles in Bavaria. A committed Nazi, he was totally entranced by Hitler and remained captivated by him. Wagener described him as a "rare personality" and viewed him with a mixture of sycophantic admiration and awestruck fear. In 1946, while being held by the British, Wagener wrote his memoirs about Hitler and the Nazi Party's early history, entitled Hitler aus nächster Nähe. Aufzeichnungen eines Vertrauten 1929−1932 (Hitler up Close. Notes from a Confidant 1929-1932). It was posthumously published in 1978, and was edited and translated into English in 1985 as Hitler: Memoirs of a Confidant. In a review of the book, The New York Times reviewer Herbert Mitgang described it as a "worshipful memoir of Hitler's ascendency", noted that it was "obviously self-serving" and that Wagener "voices no regrets except about his own stumbling career up the Nazi ladder of success".

== Selected written works ==
- Das Wirtschaftsprogramm der NSDAP (1932)
- Hitler aus nächster Nähe. Aufzeichnungen eines Vertrauten 1929−1932 (1978)
- Hitler: Memoirs of a Confidant. (Henry Ashby Turner, Jr, ed.) Yale University Press (1985)

== Military ranks ==
Dates of rank
Military rank	Date
Leutnant	18 November 1907
Oberleutnant	8 November 1914
Hauptmann	18 December 1915; 1 April 1940
Major	15 March 1941
Oberstleutnant	1 June 1942
Oberst	1 August 1943
Generalmajor	1 December 1944

== Sturmabteilung ranks ==
Dates of rank
SA rank	Date
SA-Stabschef	1 October 1929
SA-Gruppenführer	18 December 1931

== Decorations and awards ==
- 1914 Iron Cross 2nd Class
- 1914 Iron Cross 1st Class
- Military Karl-Friedrich Merit Order
- 1929 Nuremberg Party Day Badge, c.1929
- The Honour Cross of the World War 1914/1918 with Swords,
- Honour Chevron of the Old Guard, 1934
- 1939 Clasp to the Iron Cross 2nd Class
- 1939 Clasp to the Iron Cross 1st Class
- Knight's Cross of the Iron Cross, 5 May 1945 (Note: The Knight's Cross presentation to Otto Wagener was unlawfully made by the Dönitz Government after 8 May 1945. This can be verified by documented radio communication dated on 21 May 1945. The presentation date was backdated by Walther-Peer Fellgiebel.)

== Notes and references ==
=== Sources ===
- Campbell, Bruce (1998). The SA Generals and the Rise of Nazism. Lexington: University Press of Kentucky. ISBN 978-0-813-12047-8.
- Evans, Richard J. (2004). The Coming of the Third Reich. Penguin. ISBN 1-59420-004-1.
- Fellgiebel, Walther-Peer (2000) [1986]. Die Träger des Ritterkreuzes des Eisernen Kreuzes 1939–1945 — Die Inhaber der höchsten Auszeichnung des Zweiten Weltkrieges aller Wehrmachtteile [The Bearers of the Knight's Cross of the Iron Cross 1939–1945 — The Owners of the Highest Award of the Second World War of all Wehrmacht Branches] (in German). Friedberg, Germany: Podzun-Pallas. ISBN 978-3-7909-0284-6.
- Information about Otto Wagener in the Reichstag database
- Kershaw, Ian (1999). Hitler 1889–1936: Hubris. New York: W. W. Norton & Company. ISBN 0-393-04671-0.
- Klee, Ernst (2007). Das Personenlexikon zum Dritten Reich. Wer war was vor und nach 1945. Frankfurt-am-Main: Fischer-Taschenbuch-Verlag. p. 648 ISBN 978-3-596-16048-8
- Miller, Michael D.; Schulz, Andreas (2015). Leaders of the Storm Troops. Vol. 1. Solihull, England: Helion & Company. ISBN 978-1-909-98287-1.
- Patch, William L. (1985). The Christian Trade Unions in the Weimar Republic, 1918-1933: The Failure of Corporate Pluralism (illustrated ed.). Yale University Press. ISBN 0-300-03328-1.
- Scherzer, Veit (2007). Die Ritterkreuzträger 1939–1945 Die Inhaber des Ritterkreuzes des Eisernen Kreuzes 1939 von Heer, Luftwaffe, Kriegsmarine, Waffen-SS, Volkssturm sowie mit Deutschland verbündeter Streitkräfte nach den Unterlagen des Bundesarchives [The Knight's Cross Bearers 1939–1945 The Holders of the Knight's Cross of the Iron Cross 1939 by Army, Air Force, Navy, Waffen-SS, Volkssturm and Allied Forces with Germany According to the Documents of the Federal Archives] (in German). Jena, Germany: Scherzers Militaer-Verlag. ISBN 978-3-938845-17-2.
- Siemens, Daniel (2017). Stormtroopers: A New History of Hitler's Brownshirts. New Haven: Yale University Press. ISBN 978-0-300-19681-8.

Military offices
Preceded by None	SA-Stabschef; 1929–1931	Succeeded by Ernst Röhm
