= Timothy W. Ryback =

American historian

Ryback in 2026

Timothy Wernig Ryback (born February 2, 1954) is a historian and director of the Institute for Historical Justice and Reconciliation in The Hague. He previously served as the Deputy-Secretary General of the Académie Diplomatique Internationale in Paris, and Director and Vice President of the Salzburg Global Seminar. Prior to this, he was a lecturer in the Concentration of History and Literature at Harvard University. Ryback has a doctorate from Harvard.

Ryback has written on European history, politics and culture for numerous publications, including The Atlantic Monthly, The New Yorker, The New York Times and The Wall Street Journal. He is also author of Hitler's Private Library: The Books That Shaped His Life, published in 2008, which has appeared in more than 25 editions around the world. His book, The Last Survivor: Legacies of Dachau was a New York Times Notable Book for 2000. Ryback is also author of Rock Around the Bloc: A History of Rock Music in Eastern Europe and the Soviet Union, published in 1989. He has appeared in numerous television documentaries.

His 2024 book, Takeover: Hitler's Final Rise to Power, explores the final days of the Weimar Republic and its transformation into Nazi Germany. In The New Yorker review, Adam Gopnik wrote:

[T]he historian Timothy W. Ryback’s choice to make his new book, Takeover: Hitler's Final Rise to Power (Knopf), an aggressively specific chronicle of a single year, 1932, seems a wise, even an inspired one. Ryback details, week by week, day by day, and sometimes hour by hour, how a country with a functional, if flawed, democratic machinery handed absolute power over to someone who could never claim a majority in an actual election and whom the entire conservative political class regarded as a chaotic clown with a violent following.

== Selected works ==
- Timothy W. Ryback (2026). 53 Days: How Hitler Dismantled a Democracy. New York: Atlantic Monthly Press. ISBN 978-0-8021-6824-5.
- Timothy W. Ryback (2024). Takeover: Hitler's Final Rise to Power. New York: Knopf. ISBN 0593537424.
- Timothy W. Ryback (2014). Hitler's First Victims: The Quest for Justice. New York: Knopf.
- Timothy W. Ryback (2008). Hitler's Private Library: The Books That Shaped His Life. New York: Knopf.
- Timothy W. Ryback (1999). The Last Survivor: In Search of Martin Zaidenstadt. New York: Pantheon.
- Timothy W. Ryback (1990). Rock Around the Bloc: A History of Rock Music in Eastern Europe and the Soviet Union. New York: Oxford University Press. ISBN 0195056337.
