= Henry Ashby Turner =

American historian (1932–2008)

Henry Ashby Turner, Jr.
- Born: April 4, 1932; Atlanta, Georgia, United States
- Died: December 17, 2008 (aged 76); New Haven, Connecticut, United States
- Education: Washington and Lee University (BA); Princeton University (MA, PhD)
- Alma mater: Princeton University
- Occupations: Historian, professor
- Era: 20th century
- Employer: Yale University
- Known for: German Big Business and the Rise of Hitler (1985)
- Notable work: Hitler's Thirty Days to Power (1996); General Motors and the Nazis (2005)
- Awards: Stillé Professor of History (Yale)

Henry Ashby Turner Jr. (April 4, 1932 – December 17, 2008) was an American historian of Germany who was a professor at Yale University for over forty years. He is best known for his book German Big Business and the Rise of Hitler (1985) in which he challenged the common theory that industrialists in Germany were the Nazi Party’s most influential supporters.

== Life and career ==
Turner was born in Atlanta, Georgia, and attended public schools in Maryland. He received his B.A. from Washington and Lee University in 1954 and spent the academic year from 1954 to 1955 as a Fulbright scholar at the Ludwig-Maximilians-Universität München and the Free University of Berlin in Germany. In the fall of 1955, Turner began graduate study at Princeton University. He completed his M.A. in 1957 and his Ph.D. in 1960 under the supervision of Gordon A. Craig.

Turner was hired by Yale University as an instructor in history in 1958. He was elevated to assistant professor in 1961, associate professor in 1964 and professor in 1971. From 1976 to 1979 he was chairman of the Yale History Department. During his career he held a number of endowed chairs in history at Yale and trained numerous graduate students in modern German history. From 1981 to 1991, Turner also served as Master of Davenport College, one of 12 residential colleges at Yale.

Turner retired in 2002 as the Stillé Professor of History. His papers are housed in the Manuscripts and Archives Division of Sterling Memorial Library at Yale. He died from complications from melanoma on December 17, 2008, at Yale-New Haven Hospital.

== Scholarship ==
In his essay "Fascism and Modernization" from the book Reappraisals of Fascism, following the arguments first made by David Schoenbaum, Turner argued that National Socialism sought the total destruction of modern industrial society and its replacement with an agrarian society. Germans would obtain that land, or Lebensraum, in Eastern Europe, where German colonists would settle and reduce the indigenous Slavic people to slaves. However, to accomplish these goals the Nazis, despite the nature against modernism of their ideology, were forced to modernize German society further. Turner called Nazi anti-modernism a "double" form of utopianism in that it was a vision that was both impractical and unachievable.

Turner is best known for his book German Big Business and the Rise of Hitler, published in 1985, in which he rebutted the claim that it was German big business which primarily financed and otherwise promoted the attainment of power by Adolf Hitler. The book was a contribution to a historical argument about the role of big business in supporting Naziism during the Weimar Republic initiated by David Abraham's The Collapse of the Weimar Republic: Political Economy and Crisis (1981). Abraham argued, from a Marxist position, that German big business supported Hitler and this support was central to Hitler's seizure of power. Turner argued that the extent of business support for Hitler and his NSDAP had been much exaggerated. On the basis of careful examination of unpublished records of major German corporations and of the party, Turner concluded that the bulk of the Nazis' funds during their rise came from their party's members and other ordinary Germans. The principal political recipients of big business funding were the traditional center-right parties: the German People's Party and the German National People's Party. The only election campaign in which big business contributed significant amounts of money to the Nazis was the March 5, 1933 election, after the Nazis had already assumed power.

Despite this, Turner concludes that Hitler endorsed the "liberal principle of competition" and private property during his rule, if only "he could distort them into his social Darwinist view of economic life."

In Turner's view, the Third Reich was a possible but by no means inevitable result of German history, thus leading Turner to oppose the Sonderweg thesis. Turner contended that the acquisition of power by Adolf Hitler was heavily influenced by contingency and that military rule was a viable alternative to the Third Reich. In his 1996 book Hitler's Thirty Days To Power: January 1933, he maintained that it was the actions of a few individuals, such as German president Paul von Hindenburg and chancellors Franz von Papen and Kurt von Schleicher, which enabled Hitler to come to power through semilegal means. Political incompetence and personal rivalry between Papen and Schleicher ultimately led to Hitler's being appointed chancellor of Germany by President Hindenburg on January 30, 1933, although he had never won a majority in a national election.

Turner's General Motors and the Nazis (2005) examined the history during the Third Reich of Adam Opel AG, the German subsidiary of General Motors.

== Works ==
- Stresemann and the Politics of the Weimar Republic, Princeton: Princeton University Press, 1963.
- Nazism and the Third Reich, New York: Quadrangle Books, 1972
- Faschismus und Kapitalismus in Deutschland, Goettingen: Vandenhoeck & Ruprecht, 1972
- Reappraisals of Fascism (editor), New York: New Viewpoints, 1975.
- Hitler aus nächster Nähe: Aufzeichnungen eines Vertrauten 1929-1932 (editor), Frankfurt/M, Berlin, Wien: Ullstein, 1978.
- German Big Business and the Rise of Hitler, New York: Oxford University Press, 1985, translated as Die Grossunternehmer und der Aufstieg Hitlers, Berlin: Siedler Verlag, 1985.
- Hitler: Memoirs of a Confidant (editor), New Haven: Yale University Press, 1985.
- The Two Germanies since 1945, New Haven: Yale University Press, 1987, revised as
- Germany from Partition to Reunification, New Haven: Yale University Press, 1992.
- Geissel des Jahrhunderts: Hitler und seine Hinterlassenschaft, Berlin: Siedler Verlag, 1989.
- Hitler's Thirty Days to Power: January 1933, Reading, Mass.: Addison-Wesley, 1996.
- General Motors and the Nazis: The Struggle for Control of Opel, Europe's Biggest Carmaker, New Haven: Yale University Press, 2005.
