= List of shopping malls in Austria =

This is a list of shopping malls in Austria. Some are in suburbs outside the cities indicated.

Name	Location	State	GLA (m^{2})	Opened	Developer/owner	Website
Airport Center	Wals-Siezenheim	Salzburg	44,000	1993		
Atrio	Villach	Carinthia	38,700	2007	Spar European Shopping Centers GmbH	http://www.atrio.at
Auhof Center	Vienna	Vienna				https://www.auhofcenter.at/
City-Arkaden	Klagenfurt am Wörthersee	Carinthia	27,000	2006		http://www.city-arkaden-klagenfurt.at
CityPark	Graz	Styria	40,000	1971		https://www.citypark.at/
Cyta Shoppingwelt	Völs	Tyrol	50,000	1993	Rutter Immobilien Group	https://cyta.at/
DEZ	Innsbruck	Tyrol	52,765	1970	ECE Project Management	http://www.dez.at/
Donaupark Mauthausen	Mauthausen	Upper Austria	19,000	1990	Leonhard Helbich-Poschacher	http://www.donaupark.at/
Donau Zentrum	Vienna	Vienna	133,000	1975	Unibail-Rodamco-Westfield	https://www.westfield.com/en/austria/donauzentrum
Einkaufszentrum Kufstein	Kufstein	Tyrol	6,000	1980	WEG Gewerbehof 1–3	http://www.inntalcenter-kufstein.at/
EKZ Fischapark	Wiener Neustadt	Lower Austria	42,800	1996	SES Spar European Shopping Centers	http://www.fischapark.at
Europark	Salzburg-Taxham	Salzburg	35,900	1997	SPAR European Shopping Centers	http://www.europark.at
Forum1	Salzburg	Salzburg	15,000	2008	Spar European Shopping Centers	https://www.forum1.at/en/
Frunpark Asten	Asten	Upper Austria		2013		http://www.frunpark.at/
G3 Shopping Resort Gerasdorf	Gerasdorf bei Wien	Lower Austria	70,000	2012	ECE Projektmanagement	http://www.g3-shopping.at/
Galleria Shopping	Vienna	Vienna		1990		https://www.galleria.at/
Haid Center	Ansfelden	Upper Austria	100,000			http://www.haidcenter.at
Huma Eleven	Simmering	Vienna	50,000	1987	SPAR European Shopping Centers	https://www.huma-eleven.at/
Leoben City Shopping	Leoben	Styria	25,600	2007		http://www.leobencityshopping.at
Lugner City	Vienna	Vienna		1990		https://www.lugner.at/
Messepark	Dornbirn	Vorarlberg	19,000	1987		http://www.messepark.at/
Murpark	Graz	Styria	43,100	2007	Spar European Shopping Centers	http://www.murpark.at/
Neukauf Villach	Villach	Carinthia				https://www.neukauf.at/villach/
Neukauf Spittal	Spittal an der Drau	Carinthia				https://www.neukauf.at/spittal
PlusCity	Pasching	Upper Austria	70,000	1989	Ernst Kirchmayr	https://www.pluscity.at/
Q19 Einkaufsquartier Döbling	Vienna	Vienna		2005	SPAR European Shopping Centers	http://www.q19.at
Shopping Arena Alpenstraße	Salzburg	Salzburg	23,500	1990	Shopping Arena GmbH	http://www.dieshoppingarena.at/
Shopping City Seiersberg	Seiersberg	Styria	74,000	2003		https://www.shoppingcityseiersberg.at/
Shopping City Süd	Vösendorf	Lower Austria	192,600	1976	Unibail-Rodamco-Westfield	https://www.scs.at/
Sillpark	Innsbruck	Tyrol	29,500	1990	SPAR European Shopping Centers	http://www.sillpark.at/
Stadion Center	Vienna	Vienna	27,000	2007	Stadion Center Einkaufszentrumserrichtungs GmbH & Co KG	https://www.stadioncenter.at/
Stadtpark Center Spittal	Spittal an der Drau	Carinthia	18,000	2006	Warburg-HIH Invest Real Estate GmbH	http://www.stadtparkcenter.at/
Südpark	Klagenfurt am Wörthersee	Carinthia			Pletzer Group	http://www.suedpark.at/
Tenorio	Wolfsberg	Carinthia		1954		https://www.tenorio-shopping.at/
Traisenpark	Sankt Pölten	Lower Austria	35,000	1992	Convergenta Invest und Beteiligungs GmbH	http://www.traisenpark.at
UNO Shopping	Leonding	Upper Austria	32,000	1990		
Varena	Vöcklabruck	Upper Austria	32,000	2010	SPAR European Shopping Centers	https://varena.at
Zentrum Simmering	Simmering	Vienna		1981		https://zs.co.at/
Zimbapark	Bürs	Vorarlberg	17,767	2001	SPAR European Shopping Centers	http://www.zimbapark.at

- Vienna
  - Gasometer
  - Wien Mitte - The Mall
  - BahnhofCity Wien Hauptbahnhof
  - BahnhofCity Wien Westbahnhof
  - Q9
