= ÖBB Class 2143 =

Austrian diesel locomotive class

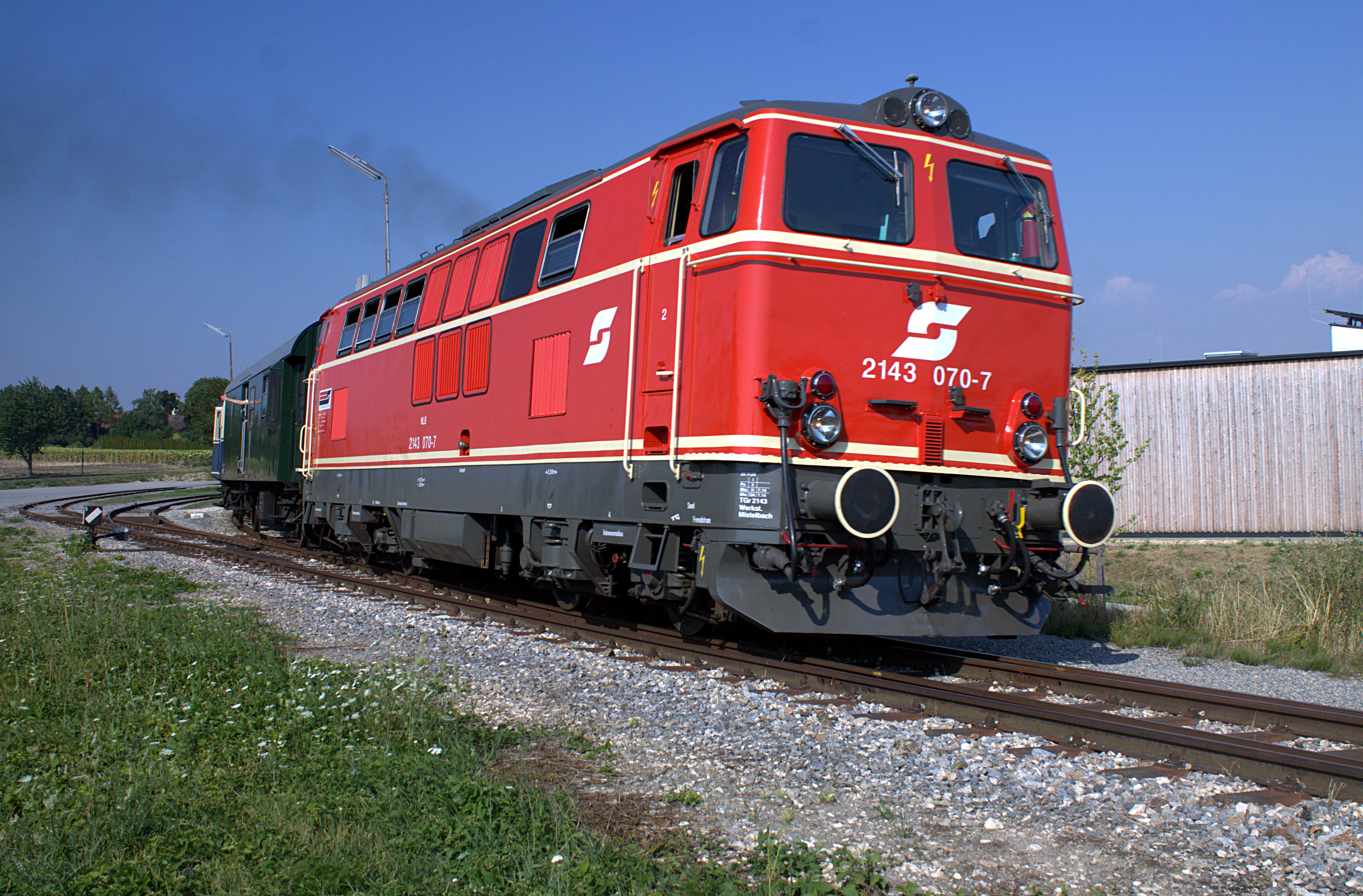
- Locomotive 2143 070 in August 2015
Type and origin
- Power type: Diesel-hydraulic
- Builder: Simmering-Graz-Pauker
- Build date: 1964–1977
- Total produced: 77
Specifications
- Configuration
  - AAR: B-B
- Gauge: 1,435 mm (4 ft 8 1/2 in)
- Wheel diameter: 950 mm (3 ft 1 in)
- Length: 15.76 m (51 ft 8 in)
- Loco weight: 68 t
- Prime mover: SGP T12c
Performance figures
- Maximum speed: 100 km/h (62 mph)
- Power output: 1,100 kW (1,475 hp)
- Tractive effort: 197 kN
Career
- Operators: Austrian Federal Railways; Stauden-Verkehrsgesellschaft; Wiener Lokalbahnen (until 2017)
- Numbers: 2143.001–2143.077
- Disposition: Austria, Germany

The ÖBB Class 2143 is a class of diesel-hydraulic locomotives operated by Austrian Federal Railways (ÖBB) in Austria.

== Technical specifications ==
The locomotives have a B-B wheel arrangement, and are powered by SGP T12c diesel motors. They are equipped with a Voith hydraulic transmission.

== History ==
The locomotives were introduced in 1965. A total of 77 locomotives, numbered 2143.001 to 2143.077, have been built by Simmering-Graz-Pauker.

Locomotive 2143.21 is operated by the Stauden-Verkehrsgesellschaft (SVG). This locomotive was formerly also operated by the Wiener Lokalbahnen.

2143 in a modern ÖBB livery

2143 in a heritage livery closely resembling the original

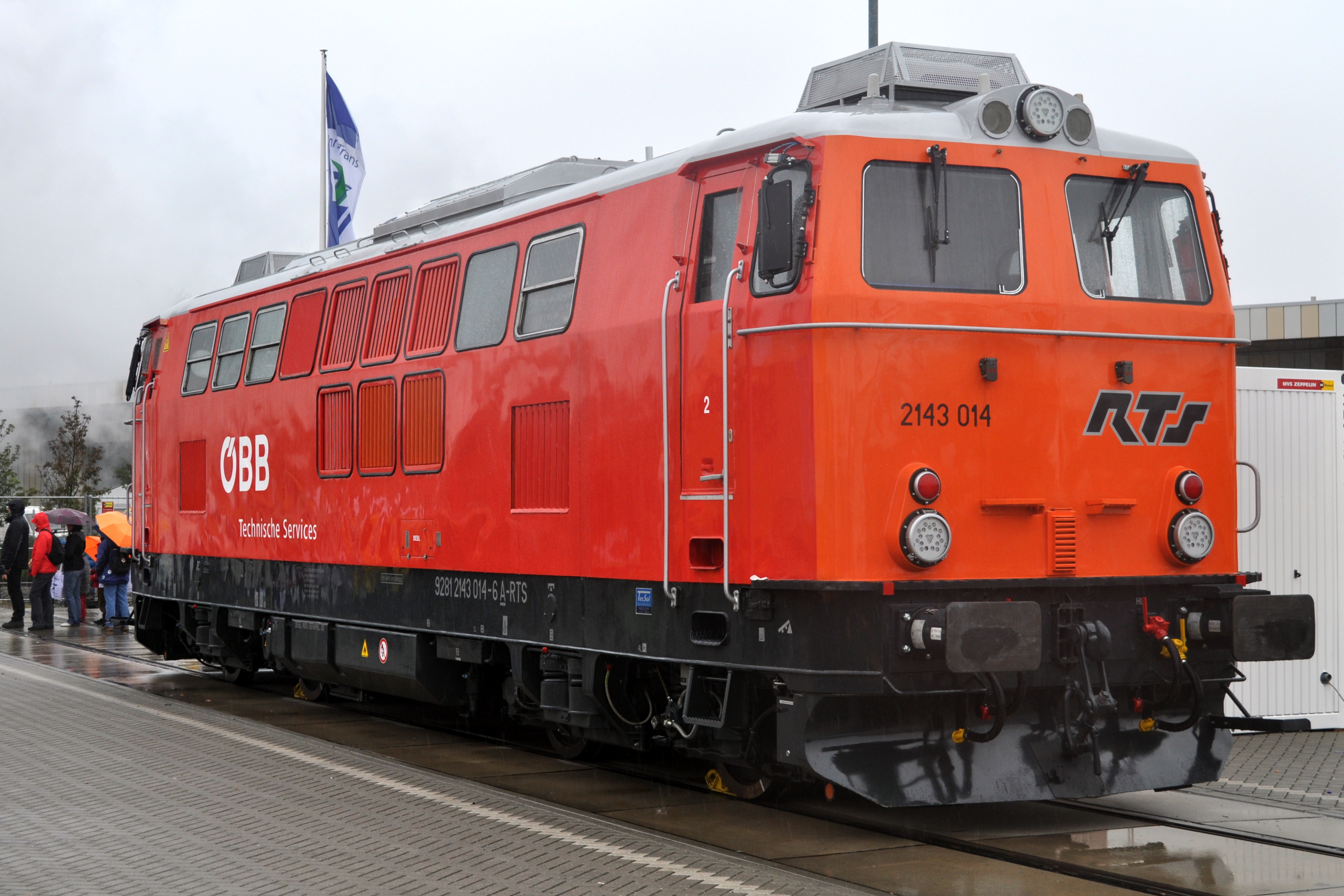
RTS 2143 at InnoTrans 2010
