= Wiener Lokalbahnen =

Company

Wiener Lokalbahnen AG
- Company type: Aktiengesellschaft
- Industry: Transportation
- Founded: 1888
- Headquarters: Vienna, Austria
- Area served: Austria (passenger transportation); Europe (cargo services)
- Key people: Thomas Duschek (CTO); Franz Stöger (CFO)
- Revenue: ▲€28,686 million (2013); €27,851 million (2012)
- Net income: ▼€1,340 million (2013); €3,353 million (2012)
- Subsidiaries: Wiener Lokalbahnen Verkehrsdienste GmbH; Wiener Lokalbahnen Cargo GmbH
- Website: wlb.at

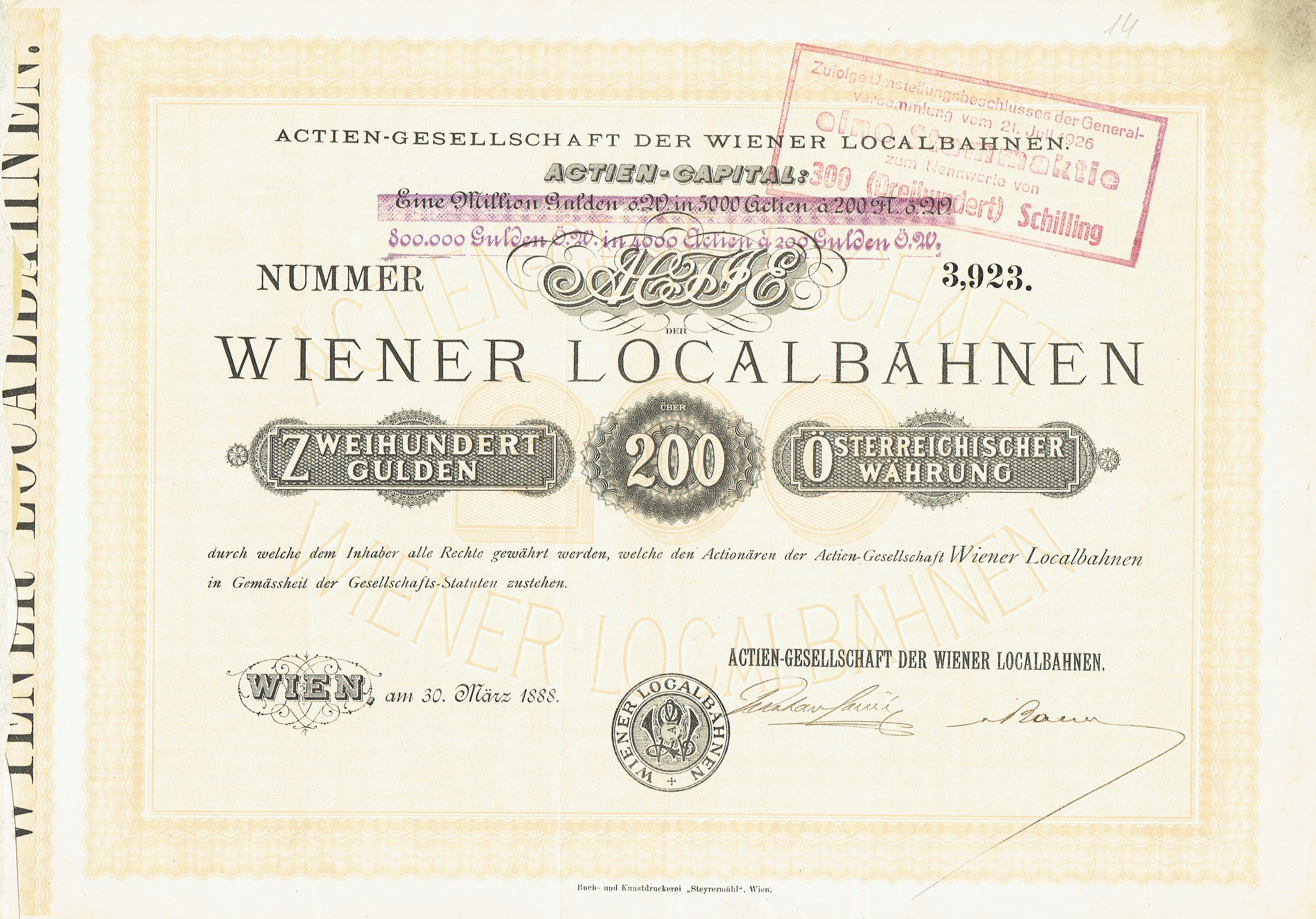
Founder's share of the AG der Wiener Localbahnen, issued 30. March 1888

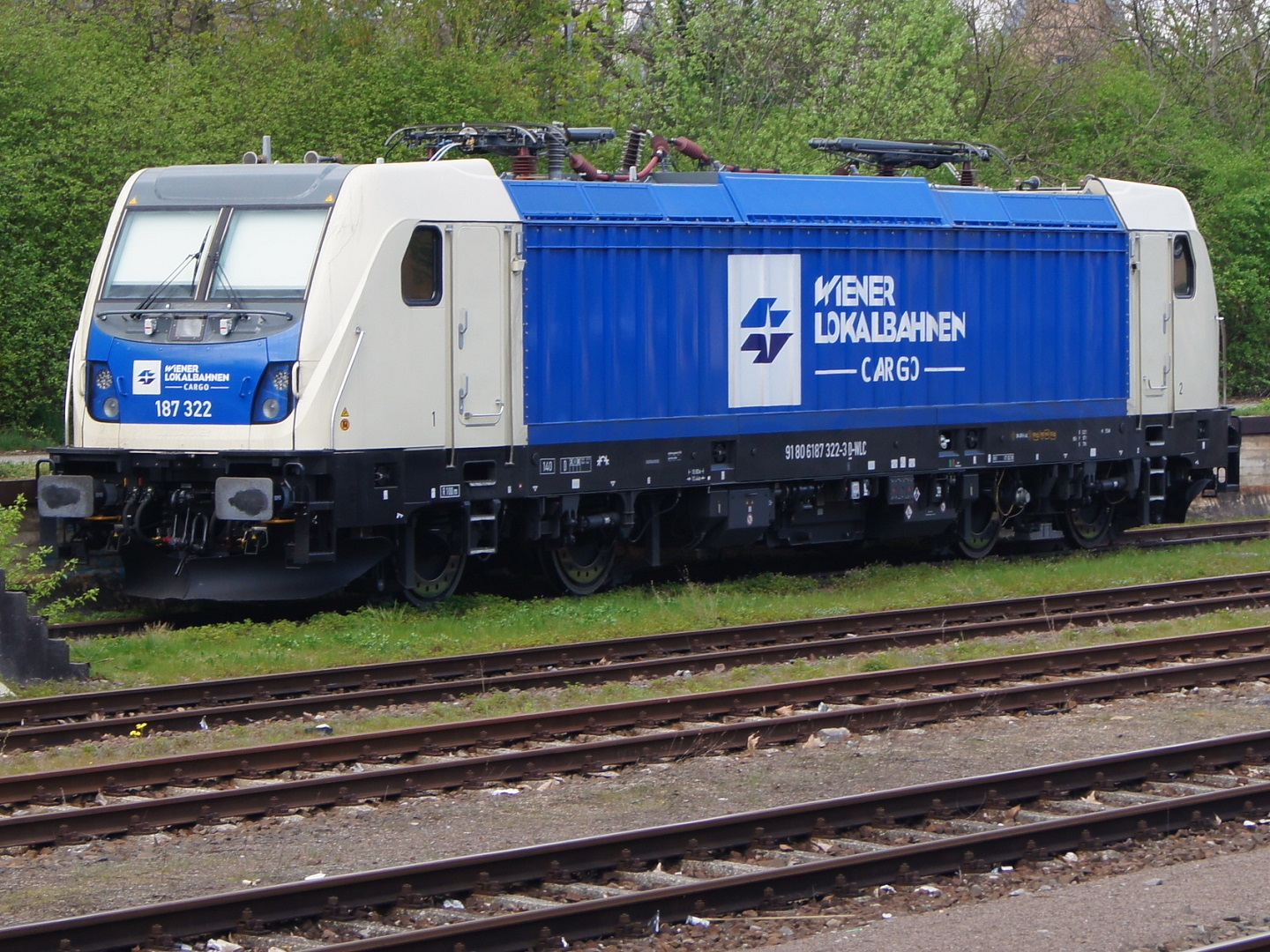
Bombardier TRAXX F140 AC3 locomotive of Wiener Lokalbahnen Cargo in the older livery (Speyer, 2018)

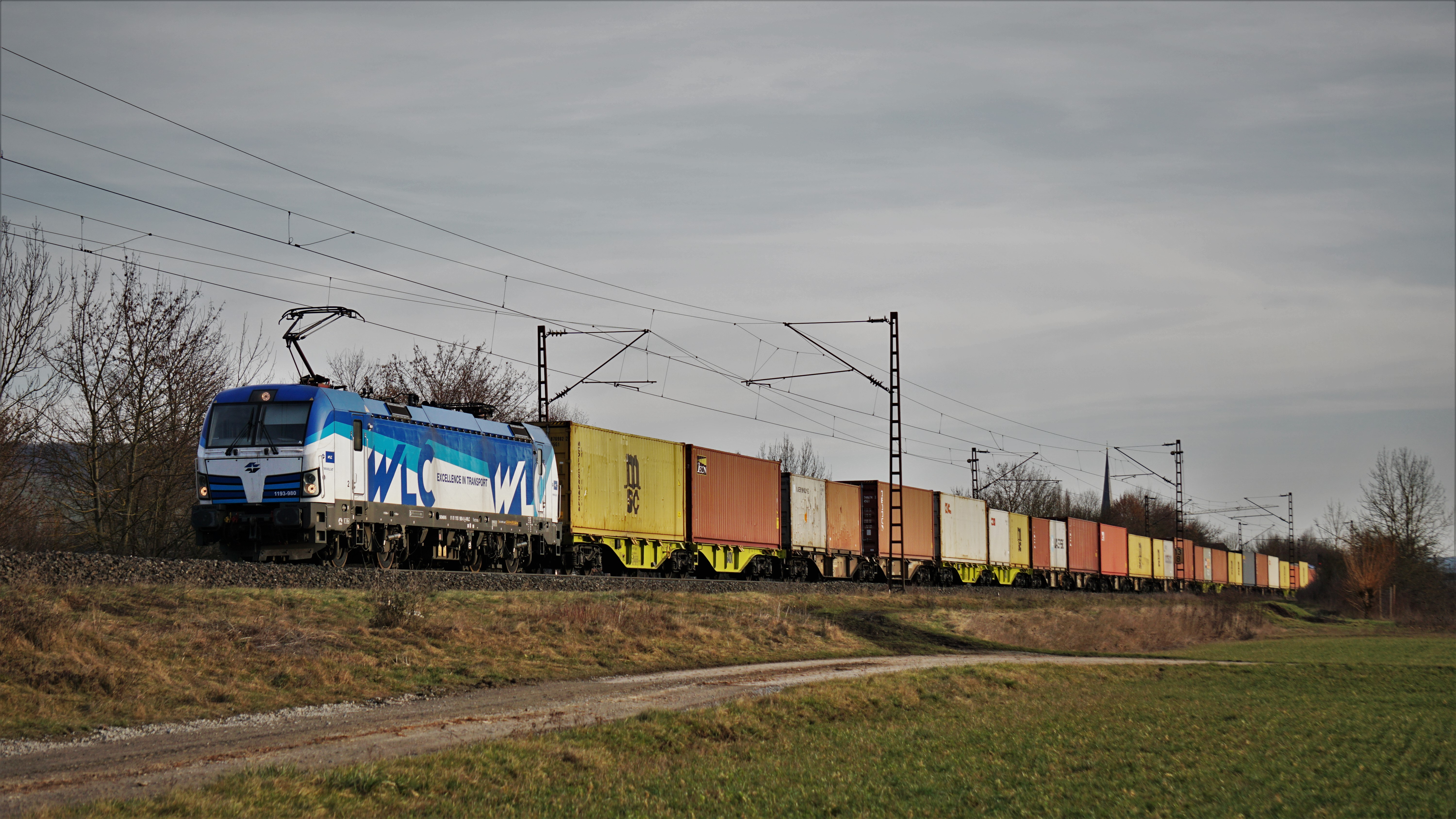
Wiener Lokalbahnen Cargo's sole Siemens Vectron locomotive in the newer livery (Thüngersheim, 2021)

The Wiener Lokalbahnen (WLB) is a transportation company in Greater Vienna, Austria. It is one of the two transportation subsidiaries of the city-owned Wiener Stadtwerke holding, the other one being Wiener Linien.

The WLB operate the Badner Bahn, a double tracked (except a single tracked segment in Baden) and completely electrified railway from Vienna to Baden, as well as several bus lines. The entire public passenger transportation division is integrated with the Verkehrsverbund Ost-Region (VOR). The company also offers freight transportation.

== Division: Rail passenger traffic ==
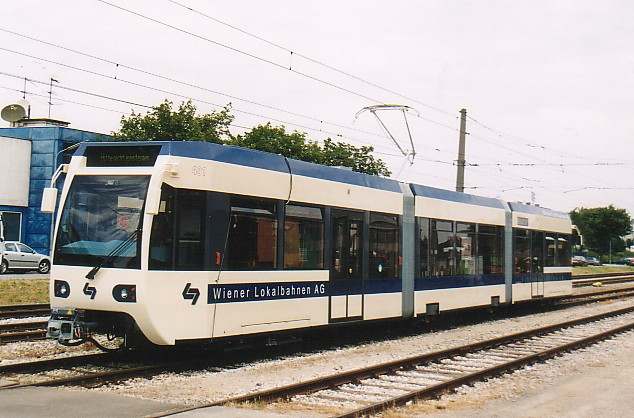
A WLB train in Inzersdorf, Vienna (2000)

The 30.4 km (18.9 mi) long railway operates between the Vienna State Opera and Baden Josefsplatz. It handles around 35,000 people every day, bringing them to work, school, Shopping City Süd or various events along the line. Between the stations "Baden Viadukt" and "Baden Leesdorf" and "Wien Schedifkaplatz" and "Wien Oper", the train operates on tram tracks and therefore must travel slowly. On the remaining route, the train operates as a heavy rail train. All together there are 35 train stations and small stops, at which the station "Karlsplatz" only gets served when the train travels in the direction Vienna Opera.

== Division: Bus passenger traffic ==
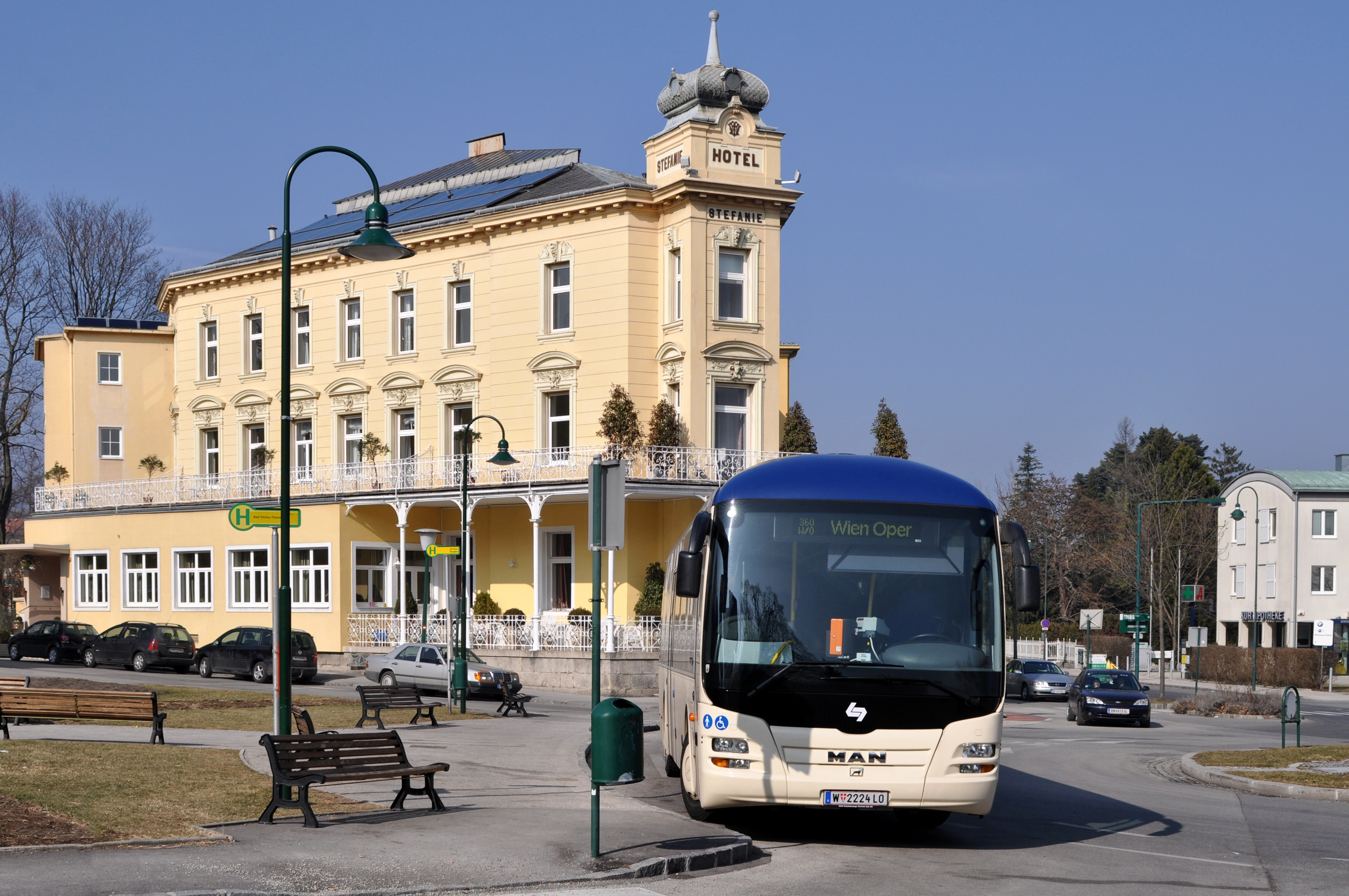
A WLB bus in Bad Vöslau (2011)

The WLB operate the bus lines 357, 358, 359, 360 and 361 in the Verkehrsverbund Ost-Region (VOR). The lines 357, 358 and 359 are the three city bus lines in Baden. The bus line 360, the so-called Casinobus Baden, operates the round-trip Wien Oper – Baden – Bad Vöslau – Gainfarn and is integrated into the night service network of the Wiener Linien. The line 361 operates between Baden, Oeynhausen, Möllersdorf, Bad Vöslau and the "Industriezentrum Niederösterreich Süd".

The WLB are also the operator of the IKEA-bus at the SCS in Vösendorf. For this, one bus of the type MAN NL 263/283 obtained a special foil with the IKEA logo. However, this line has been suspended as of 29 September. 2012. Customers can use the other two IKEA busses leaving from the Siebenhirten metro station (Mo–Sa) or alternatively travel on the "Badner Bahn". The trip segment from Vösendorf Siebenhirten to Vösendorf SCS is free of charge for holders of the Family Card.

== Subsidiaries ==
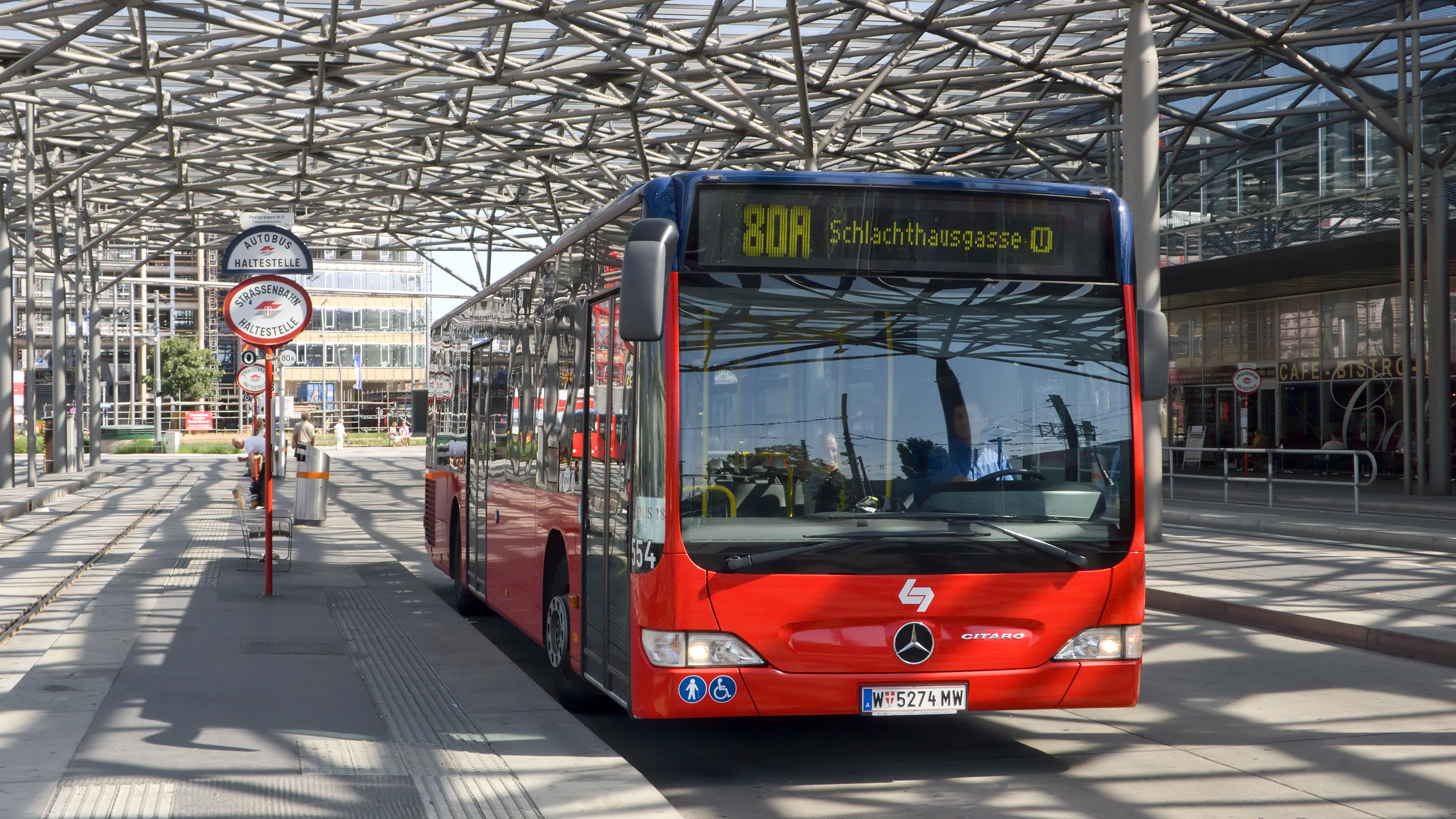
A WLBB bus at the Praterstern train station, Vienna (2010)

=== Wiener Lokalbahnen Cargo (WLC) ===
The Wiener Lokalbahnen Cargo owns the license to travel on tracks in Austria and the EU. The WLC partly uses its own infrastructure (with its own trains), and third party tracks (also with its own trains) for cargo services. The WLC also owns several cargo rail cars. The following trains are used by the WLC:

- 1 diesel engine, built by the former "Jenbacher Werke"
- 3 diesel engines, ex DR, series V100

The WLC also rented 11 Eurosprinter ES64 U2 engines from Siemens-Dispolok.

Three electric locomotives (1116 series) are described as Bosporus-sprinters, because they are equipped with railway supervision systems currently used in trains in Hungary (EVM 120), Romania, Bulgaria and Turkey. These trains are currently used in the daily "East Line Shuttle" (Duisburg – Enns/Krems/Wien – Budapest) and in trains going to Hungary.

There are another 8 electric locomotives from the 1116 series, which are mostly used in north–south routes (North sea docks – Austria). These locomotives all wear the colors of the WLC, except the locomotive no. 83, which is red. The WLC colors are blue and creme white.

The cargo division was separated from the main company in late 2007 and is a 100% subsidiary of WLB, run under the name Wiener Lokalbahnen Cargo GmbH (WLC). In 2006 the total revenue was 26,1 Mio. EUR. The goal for 2008 is to increase the cargo volume, especially in the combined freight transport.

WLC also operated several Siemens ES64U4 locomotives (numbers 951 to 954) that were sold to the České Dráhy in 2021, having already operated in the Czech Republic prior to their sale. At the end of 2014, it purchased a Siemens Vectron with the UIC number of 91 81 1193 980-0. In 2017 it purchased three Bombardier TRAXX F140 AC3 locomotives (921-923), followed in 2019 by three more (924-926). Currently two locomotives wear its new livery unveiled in 2020: its sole Vectron (980) and TRAXX number 921. It has also leased other ES64U2 Taurus and Vectron locomotives from various leasing companies, notably Railpool and MRCE and European Locomotive Leasing.

=== Wiener Lokalbahnen Verkehrsdienste (WLV) ===
The main assignment of this company is to transport severely handicapped people. The travel bus division of the WLB was also reassigned to the WLV, and so all travel buses had to be re-registered to the WLV. The fleet for disabled consists of 98 Mercedes vans, which are all handicapped accessible. The travel bus fleet mostly consists of buses of the companies Setra, Volvo and Neoplan.

=== Wiener Lokalbahnen Busbetrieb (WLBB) ===
The WLBB was established in 2004, and is operative since early 2005. The first two bus lines of the WLBB were the 27A (since 2 June 2005) and 37A (since 9 October 2005), which were operated on behalf of the Wiener Linien. On 1 February, the bus lines 16A and 60A were transferred from the WLB to the WLBB. Therefore, only the bus lines in the region of Baden are operated by the WLB themselves. Since 6 August 2006 the WLBB operate the Viennese bus line 80A instead of the ÖBB-Postbus GmbH on behalf of the Wiener Linien. In 2012, the Wiener Lokalbahnen sold the WLBB to the Austrian transportation company Gschwindl.

== See also ==
- Rail transport in Austria
