= Alois Hitler =

Father of Adolf Hitler (1837–1903)

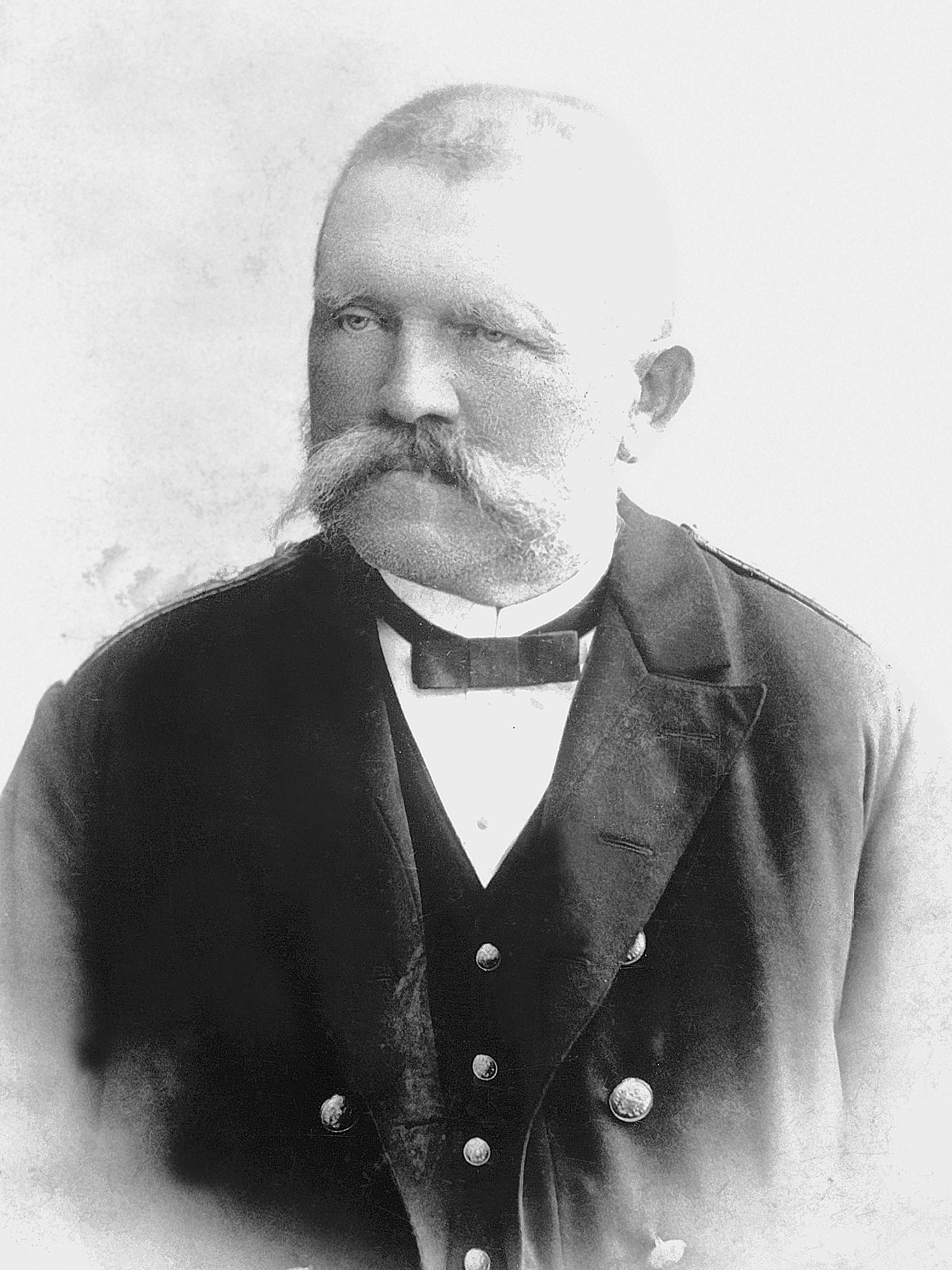
- Hitler in 1901
- Born: Alois Schicklgruber; 7 June 1837; Strones, Austria
- Died: 3 January 1903 (aged 65); Leonding, Austria-Hungary
- Resting place: Leonding's town cemetery
- Occupation: Customs officer
- Spouses: Anna Glasl-Hörer (m. 1873; died 1883); Franziska Matzelsberger (m. 1883; died 1884); Klara Pölzl (m. 1885)
- Children: 9, including Angela, Adolf and Paula
- Parents: See biological father; Maria Anna Schicklgruber
- Relatives: Hitler family

Alois Hitler (né Schicklgruber; 7 June 1837 – 3 January 1903) was an Austrian civil servant in the customs service and the father of Adolf Hitler, the dictator of Nazi Germany.

Alois Schicklgruber was born out of wedlock. His mother was Maria Schicklgruber, but his biological father remains unknown. This uncertain parentage has led to claims that Alois's third wife, Klara (Adolf's mother), may have also been either Alois's first cousin once removed or his half-niece.

Alois married his first wife, Anna, in 1873. In 1876, Alois convinced the Austrian local authorities to acknowledge his deceased stepfather Johann Georg Hiedler as his biological father. This meant that Klara legally became Alois's first cousin once removed. Alois then legally changed his last name to that of his deceased stepfather Johann, but the authorities misspelled the last name as "Hitler" for unknown reasons.

Also in 1876, while Alois was still married to his first wife, Anna, he hired his relative Klara as a household servant and began an affair with her. Their relationship continued in secrecy until Alois's second wife, Franziska, died and Klara became pregnant, which prompted Alois to marry her in 1885. According to a close friend, Alois was "awfully rough" with his wife Klara and "hardly ever spoke a word to her at home". Alois treated his children with similar contempt and often beat them.

== Early life and education ==
Alois Hitler was born Alois Schicklgruber in the hamlet of Strones, a parish of Döllersheim in the Waldviertel of northwest Lower Austria; his mother was Maria Schicklgruber, a 42-year-old unmarried peasant whose family had lived in the area for generations. At his baptism in Döllersheim, the space for his father's name on the baptismal certificate was left blank and the priest wrote "illegitimate". His mother cared for Alois in a house she shared with her elderly father, Johannes Schicklgruber.

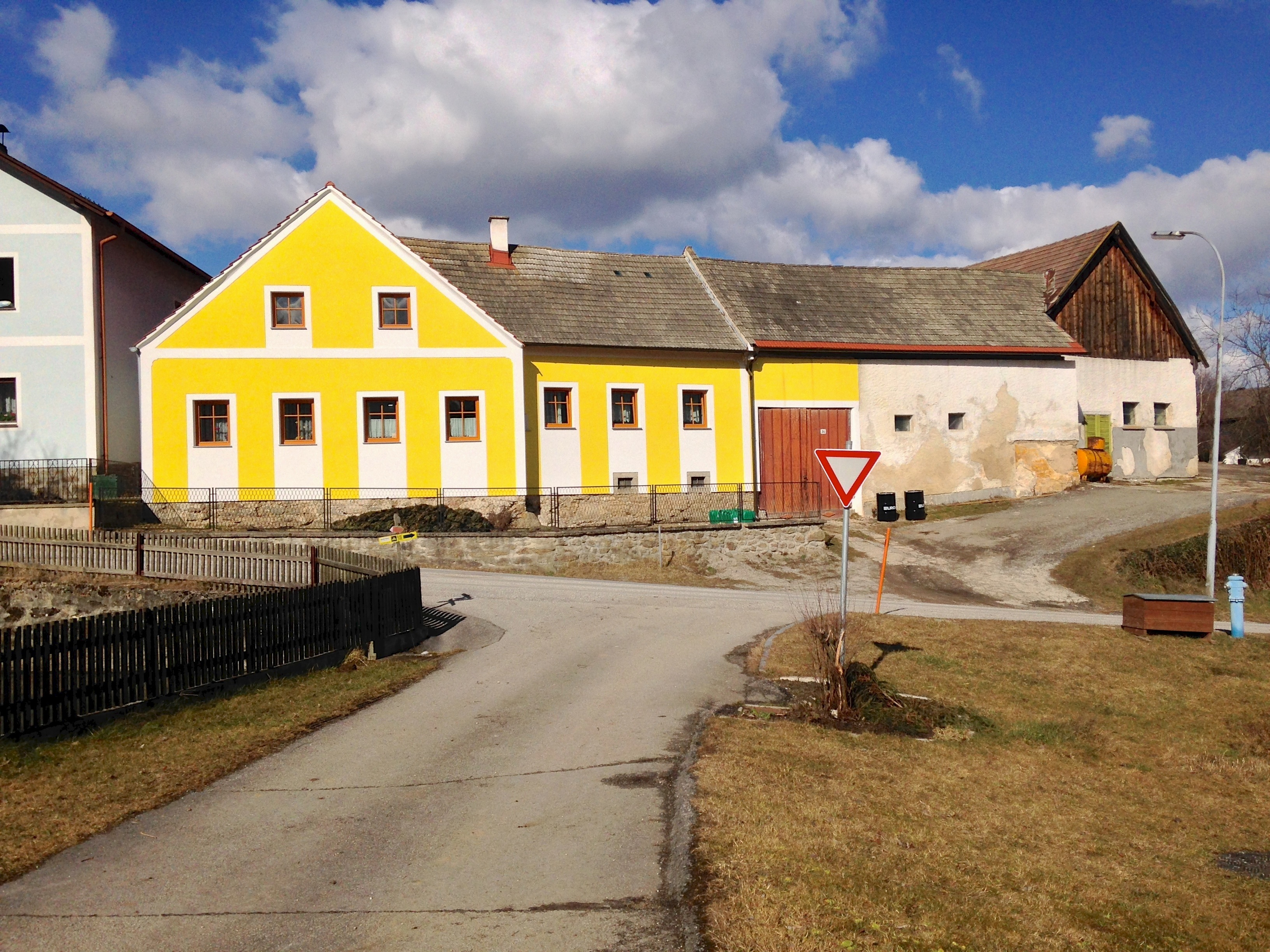
Home of Johann Nepomuk Hiedler

Sometime later, a man named Johann Georg Hiedler moved in with the Schicklgrubers. He married Maria when Alois was five, and Maria died when Alois was nine. By the age of 10, Alois had been sent to live with Johann Georg Hiedler's younger brother, Johann Nepomuk Hiedler, who owned a farm in the nearby village of Spital (south of Weitra). Alois attended elementary school and took lessons in shoemaking from a local cobbler. Growing up in the same household with Alois was Johanna, the mother of his future wife Klara.

At the age of 13, Alois left Johann Nepomuk Hiedler's farm in Spital and went to Vienna as an apprentice cobbler, working there for about five years. In response to a recruitment drive by the Austrian government offering employment in the civil service to people from rural areas, Alois joined the frontier guards (customs service) of the Austrian Finance Ministry in 1855 at the age of 18.

=== Uncertain identity of biological father ===
Historians have proposed various candidates as Alois's biological father: Johann Georg Hiedler, his younger brother Johann Nepomuk Hiedler (or Hüttler), and Leopold Frankenberger (a purportedly Jewish man, whose existence has never been found to be documented). Johann Georg Hiedler became the stepfather of five-year-old Alois and many years later, he was posthumously declared the legal birth father of Alois.

According to historian Frank McDonough, the most plausible theory is that Johann Georg Hiedler was actually the birth father. But the birth father may alternatively have been his younger brother Johann Nepomuk Hiedler. Regardless of how Nepomuk was related to Alois, if at all, Nepomuk was certainly the maternal grandfather of Alois's third wife (Adolf Hitler's mother) Klara.

Historian Werner Maser suggests that Alois's biological father was not Johann Georg Hiedler, but rather Johann Nepomuk Hiedler, who raised Alois through adolescence and later willed to Alois a considerable portion of his life savings, although he never publicly admitted to being Alois's natural father. According to Maser, Nepomuk was a married farmer who had an affair with Maria Schicklgruber and then arranged to have his single brother Johann Georg Hiedler marry Alois's mother Maria to provide a cover for Nepomuk's desire to assist and care for Alois without upsetting his wife. If the theory is true, then Alois's third wife Klara was also Alois's half-niece, but Adolf Hitler biographer Joachim Fest believes that any attempts to pin down whether Johann Georg Hiedler or Johann Nepomuk Hiedler was Alois's father will "peter out in the obscurity of confused relationships marked by meanness, dullness, and rustic bigotry".

In 1931 Adolf Hitler ordered the Schutzstaffel (SS) to investigate the rumors regarding his ancestry, and they found no evidence of any Jewish ancestors. After the Nuremberg Laws came into effect in Nazi Germany, Hitler ordered the genealogist Rudolf Koppensteiner to publish a large illustrated genealogical tree showing his ancestry. This was published in the book Die Ahnentafel des Führers ("The Pedigree of the Leader") in 1937 and purported to show that Hitler's family were all Austrian Germans with no Jewish ancestry and that Hitler had an unblemished "Aryan" pedigree. Alois himself had claimed Johann Georg Hiedler was his biological father, and a priest accordingly amended Alois's birth certificate in 1876, which was considered certified proof for Hitler's ancestry; thus Hitler was considered a "pure" Aryan. Also in 1876, Alois hired 16-year-old Klara as a household servant.

Although Johann Georg Hiedler was considered the officially accepted paternal grandfather of Adolf Hitler by the Third Reich, the question of who his grandfather really was has caused much speculation, and the answer remains unknown. As German historian Joachim Fest wrote:

The indulgence normally accorded to a man's origins is out of place in the case of Adolf Hitler, who made documentary proof of Aryan ancestry a matter of life and death for millions of people but himself possessed no such document. He did not know who his grandfather was. Intensive research into his origins, accounts of which have been distorted by propagandist legends and which are in any case confused and murky, has failed so far to produce a clear picture. National Socialist versions skimmed over the facts and emphasised, for example, that the population of the so-called Waldviertel, from which Hitler came, had been "tribally German since the Migration of the Peoples", or more generally, that Hitler had "absorbed the powerful forces of this German granite landscape into his blood through his father".

Following the war, Adolf Hitler's former lawyer, Hans Frank, claimed that Hitler told him in 1930 that one of his relatives was trying to blackmail him by threatening to reveal his alleged Jewish ancestry. Adolf Hitler asked Frank to find out the facts. Frank says he determined that at the time Maria Schicklgruber gave birth to Alois, she was working as a household cook in the town of Graz, that her employers were a Jewish family named Frankenberger, and that her child might have been conceived out of wedlock with the family's 19-year-old son, Leopold Frankenberger.

Opponents of the Frankenberger thesis have asserted that all Jews had been expelled from the province of Styria – which includes Graz – in the 15th century by Maximilian I, and that they were not officially allowed to return until the 1860s, when Alois was around 30. Also, there is no evidence of a Frankenberger family living in Graz at that time. Scholars such as Ian Kershaw and Brigitte Hamann dismiss the Frankenberger hypothesis, which had only Frank's speculation to support it, as baseless.

Kershaw cites several stories circulating in the 1920s about Hitler's alleged Jewish ancestry, including one about a "Baron Rothschild" in Vienna in whose household Maria Schicklgruber had worked for some time as a servant. Kershaw discusses and also lists Hitler's family tree in his biography of Adolf Hitler and gives no support to the Frankenberger tale. Hans Frank himself seemed skeptical about Hitler's possible Jewish ancestry, saying "The fact that Adolf Hitler had no Jewish blood in his veins, seems, from what has been his whole manner, so blatant to me that it needs no further word". Further, Frank's story contains several inaccuracies and contradictions, such as the statement Frank made that Maria Schicklgruber came from "Leonding near Linz", when in fact she came from the hamlet of Strones, near the village of Döllersheim.

In 2019, gender psychologist Leonard Sax published a paper title "Aus den Gemeinden von Burgenland: revisiting the question of Adolf Hitler's paternal grandfather". Sax claims that Hamann, Kershaw, and other leading historians relied, either directly or indirectly, on a single source for the claim that no Jews were living in Graz prior to 1856: that source was the Austrian historian Nikolaus von Preradovich, whom Sax showed was a fervent admirer of Adolf Hitler. Sax cited primary Austrian sources from the 1800s to demonstrate that there was in fact "eine kleine, nun angesiedelte Gemeinde" – "a small, now settled community" – of Jews living in Graz prior to 1856. Sax's article has been picked up by a number of news outlets.

Sax argued that one factor in Hitler's extreme antisemitism was "his intense need to prove" that he was not Jewish. British historian Richard J. Evans dismissed Sax's arguments and claims and stated: "Even if there were Jews living in Graz in the 1830s, at the time when Adolf Hitler's father Alois was born, this does not prove anything at all about the identity of Hitler's paternal grandfather." Evans argued that speculation about Hitler's ancestry persists "because some people have found his deep and murderous anti-Semitism hard to explain unless there were personal motives behind it ... This seems to be the motivation for Dr. Leonard Sax, a psychiatrist, not a historian, making his claims".

Ron Rosenbaum suggests that Frank, who had turned against Nazism after 1945 but remained an anti-Semitic fanatic, made the claim that Hitler had Jewish ancestry as a way of proving that Hitler was a Jew and not an Aryan. A genetic study that collected DNA of 38 living relatives of Hitler concluded that, with high probability, Hitler's genotype included the E1b1b DNA haplogroup, sub-clade undisclosed. An author of the study stated:

I never wrote that [Adolf] Hitler was a Jew, or that he had a Jewish grandfather. I only wrote that Hitler's haplogroup is E1b1b, being more common among Afroasiatic speakers than among overall Germans.

== Career as customs official ==
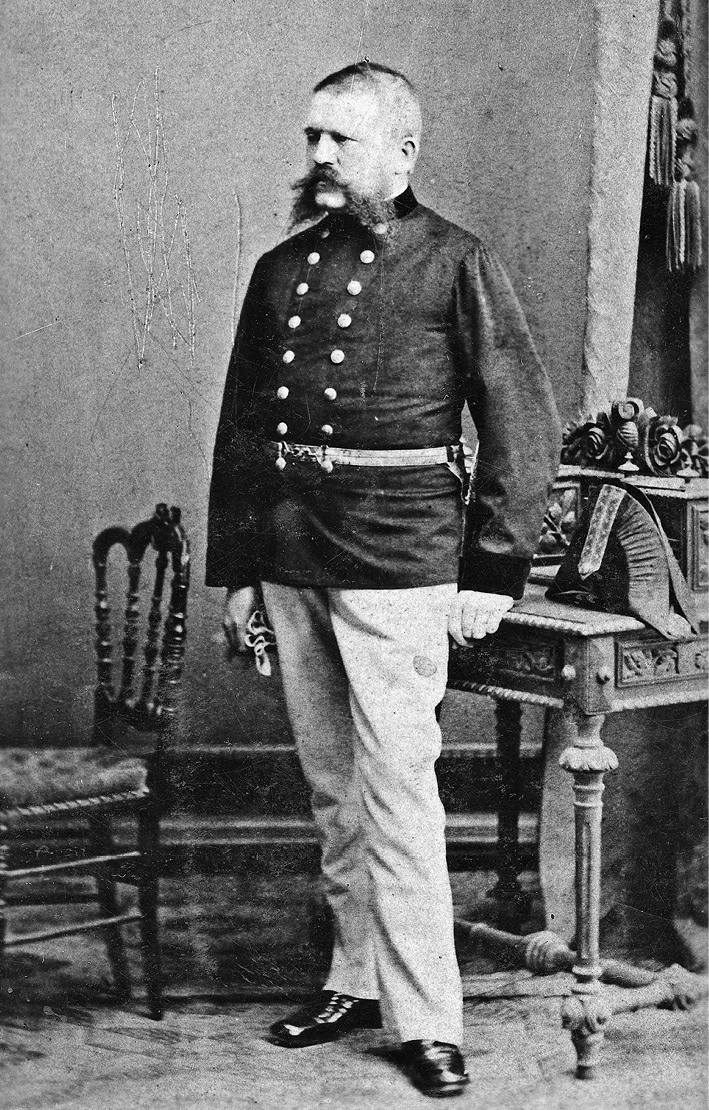
Alois Hitler regularly wore his uniform even after retiring, and insisted on being addressed as Herr Oberoffizial Hitler, c. 1897–1899.

Schicklgruber was a Liberal, Pan-German and German nationalist, but was loyal to the Emperor of Austria. Initially Schicklgruber made steady progress in the semi-military profession of customs official. The work involved frequent reassignments and he served in a variety of places across Austria. By 1860, after five years of service, he reached the rank of Finanzwach-Oberaufseher (Revenue guard Senior warden, analogous to an Army Corporal). By 1864, after special training and examinations, Schicklgruber had advanced to provisorischer Amtsassistent (provisional Office assistant, analogous to a provisional Second lieutenant) and was serving in Linz, Austria. He later became a Zollamts-Official (Inspector of customs, i.e. (First) Lieutenant) posted at Braunau am Inn in 1875. Then his career suddenly came to a nearly dead end when it took him 17 years to get his last promotion. In 1892, he eventually rose to provisorischer resp., and in 1894 to definitiver Zolloberamts-Official (definite senior inspector of customs, i.e. Army captain). Schicklgruber (from 1877 under his new surname Hitler) could go no higher because he lacked the necessary school degrees.

=== Change of surname ===
As a rising young junior customs official, he used his birth name of Schicklgruber, but in mid-1876, 39 years old and well established in his career, he asked permission to use his stepfather's family name. He appeared before the parish priest in Döllersheim and asserted that his father was Johann Georg Hiedler, who had married his mother and now wished to legitimize him. Three relatives appeared with him as witnesses, one of whom was Johann Nepomuk, Hiedler's brother. The priest agreed to amend the birth certificate, the civil authorities automatically processed the church's decision and Alois Schicklgruber had a new name. The official change, registered at the government office in Mistelbach in 1877, transformed him into "Alois Hitler". It is not known who decided on the spelling of Hitler instead of Hiedler. Johann Georg's brother was sometimes known by the surname Hüttler.

Historian Bradley F. Smith states that Alois Schicklgruber openly admitted having been born out of wedlock before and after the name change. Alois may have been influenced to change his name for the sake of legal expediency. Historian Werner Maser claims that in 1876, Franz Schicklgruber, the administrator of Alois's mother's estate and also an uncle of Alois, transferred a large sum of money (230 gulden) to him. Supposedly, Johann Georg Hiedler, who died in 1857, relented on his deathbed and left an inheritance to his illegitimate stepson (Alois) together with his surname. Some Schicklgrubers remain in the Waldviertel.

== Personal life ==
=== Illegitimate daughter ===
In early 1869, Alois Hitler had an affair with Thekla Penz (born 24 September 1844) of Leopoldstein, Arbesbach, in the district of Zwettel, Lower Austria. This led to the birth of Theresia Penz on 31 October 1869. Thekla later married a man by the name of Horner, while Theresia married Johan Ramer.

=== Early married life ===
Alois Hitler was 36 years old in 1873 when he married for the first time. Anna Glasl-Hörer was the wealthy, 50-year-old daughter of a customs official. She was infirm when they married and was either an invalid or became one shortly afterwards. Not long after marrying his first wife, Alois began an affair with Franziska "Fanni" Matzelsberger, one of the young female servants employed at the Pommer Inn, house number 219, in the town Braunau am Inn, where he was renting the top floor as a lodging. Smith states that Alois had numerous affairs in the 1870s, resulting in his wife initiating legal action; on 7 November 1880, Alois and Anna separated by mutual agreement but remained married. The 19-year-old Matzelsberger became the 43-year-old Hitler's mistress.

In 1876, four years before separating from Anna, he had hired Klara Pölzl as a household servant. She was the 16-year-old granddaughter of his step-uncle Nepomuk (who may also have been his biological father or uncle). If Nepomuk was Alois Hitler's biological father, then Klara was Alois's half-niece; alternatively, if Johann Georg were Alois’s biological father, then Klara was Alois’s first cousin once removed. Matzelsberger demanded that the "servant girl" Klara find another job, and Hitler sent Pölzl away.

On 13 January 1882, Matzelsberger gave birth to Hitler's illegitimate son, also named Alois, but since they were not married, the child's last name was Matzelsberger, making him "Alois Matzelsberger". Hitler kept Fanni Matzelsberger as his mistress while his lawful wife (Anna from whom he had separated) grew sicker and died on 6 April 1883. The next month, on 22 May at a ceremony in Braunau with fellow custom officials as witnesses, Hitler, 45, married Matzelsberger, 21. He then legitimized his son as Alois Hitler Jr. The second child of Alois (Senior) and Fanni was Angela, born on 28 July 1883.

Hitler was secure in his profession and no longer an ambitious climber. Historian Alan Bullock described him as "hard, unsympathetic and short-tempered". His wife Fanni, still only 23, acquired a lung disorder and became too ill to function. She was moved to Ranshofen, a small village near Braunau. During the last months of Fanni's life, Klara Pölzl returned to Hitler's home to look after the invalid and the two children (Alois Jr. and Angela). Fanni died in Ranshofen on 10 August 1884 at the age of 23. After Fanni’s death, Pölzl remained in his home as housekeeper.

=== Marriage to Klara Pölzl and family life ===
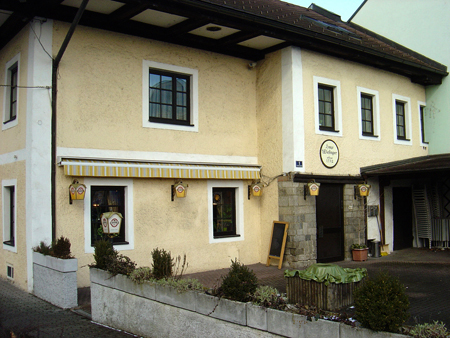
Gasthaus Wiesinger in February 2009

Pölzl was soon pregnant by Hitler. Historian Bradley Smith writes that if Hitler had been free to do as he wished, he would have married Pölzl immediately in 1884, but because of the 1877 affidavit concerning his last name and paternity, Hitler was now legally Pölzl's first cousin once removed, too close to marry. He submitted an appeal to the church for a humanitarian waiver. (Note: Alois petitioned the church for an episcopal dispensation citing "bilateral affinity in the third degree touching the second" to describe his rather complicated family relationship to Klara. The local bishop apparently believed this relationship was too close to approve on his own authority, so he forwarded the petition to Rome on behalf of Alois, seeking instead a papal dispensation, which was approved before the birth of the couple's first child. See Rosenbaum, Ron "Explaining Hitler: Chapter One" The New York Times)

Permission from Rome arrived, and on 7 January 1885 a wedding was held at Hitler's rented rooms on the top floor of the Pommer Inn. A meal was served for the few guests and witnesses. Hitler then went to work for the rest of the day. Even Klara found the wedding to be a short ceremony. During their marriage, and consistent with Alois's father perhaps being the same person as Klara’s maternal grandfather, Alois and Klara continued to address each other as "uncle" and "niece".

On 17 May 1885, four months after the wedding, the new Frau Klara Hitler gave birth to her first child, Gustav. In 1886, she gave birth to a daughter, Ida. In 1887, Otto was born but died days later. During the winter of 1887–1888, diphtheria struck the Hitler household, resulting in the deaths of both Gustav (8 December) and Ida (2 January).

On 20 April 1889, she gave birth to another son, future dictator of Nazi Germany Adolf Hitler. Adolf was a sickly child, and his mother fretted over him. Alois was 51 when he was born, and had little interest in child-rearing; he left it all to his wife. When not at work he was either in a tavern or busy with his hobby, beekeeping. Alois was transferred from Braunau to Passau. He was 55, Klara 32, Alois Jr. 10, Angela 9, and Adolf was three years old.

Beginning on 1 August 1892, the family lived at Theresienstrasse 23 in Passau. One month after Alois accepted a better-paying position in Linz, on 1 April 1893 his wife and the children moved to a second floor room at Kapuzinerstrasse 31 in Passau. Klara had just given birth to Edmund, so it was decided she and the children would stay in Passau for the time being. On 21 January 1896, Paula, Adolf's younger sister, was born. She was the last child of Alois Hitler and Klara Pölzl. He had five children ranging in age from infancy to 14. Edmund (the youngest of the boys) died of measles on 2 February 1900.

Alois wanted his son Adolf to seek a career in the civil service. However, Adolf had become so alienated from his father that he was repulsed by his wishes. He sneered at the thought of a lifetime spent enforcing petty rules. Alois tried to browbeat his son into obedience, while Adolf did his best to be the opposite of whatever his father wanted.

Unlike Klara, who was a devout practicing Catholic, Alois was a freethinker, sceptical of the Catholic Church, anti-clerical, and considered religion a scam and "crutch for human weakness". Robert G. L. Waite noted, "Even one of his closest friends admitted that Alois was 'awfully rough' with his wife [Klara] and 'hardly ever spoke a word to her at home'." If Alois was in a bad mood, he picked on the older children or Klara herself, in front of them. Alois's grandson, William Patrick Hitler said that he had heard from his father, Alois Jr., that Alois Hitler Sr. used to beat his children. After Hitler and his eldest son Alois Jr. had a climactic and violent argument, Alois Jr. left home, and the elder Alois swore he would never give the boy a penny of inheritance beyond what the law required. According to reports, Alois Hitler liked to lord it over his neighbors, and even beat his own family’s dog until it would wet the floor.

Alois has been described as "an authoritarian, overbearing, domineering husband and a stern, masterful, and often irritable father" and as a "strict, short-tempered patriarch who demanded unquestioning respect and obedience from his children and used the switch whenever his expectations were not met."

== Retirement and death ==
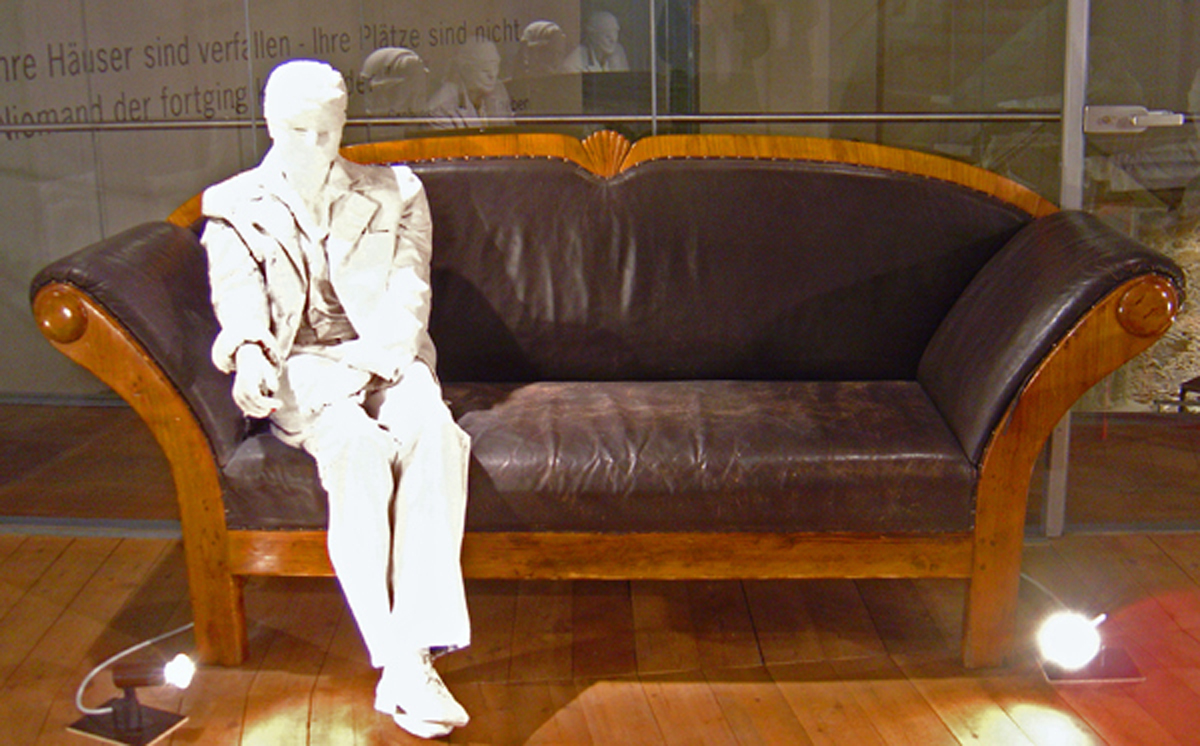
The couch on which Alois Hitler died

In February 1895, Alois Hitler purchased a house on a 3.6-hectare (9-acre) plot in Hafeld near Lambach, approximately 50 kilometres (30 mi) southwest of Linz. The farm was called the Rauscher Gut. (Note: "Rauscher" means cider at the beginning of fermentation, and "Gut" means farm in this context.) He moved his family to the farm and retired on 25 June 1895 at the age of 58, after 40 years in the customs service.

On the morning of 3 January 1903, Alois went to the Gasthaus Wiesinger (no. 1 Michaelsbergstrasse, Leonding) as usual to drink his morning glass of wine. He was offered the newspaper and promptly collapsed. He was taken to an adjoining room and a doctor was summoned, but he died at the inn, probably from a pleural hemorrhage. Adolf Hitler, who was 13 when his father died, wrote in Mein Kampf that he died of a "stroke of apoplexy". In his book, The Young Hitler I Knew, Hitler's childhood friend August Kubizek recalled, "When the fourteen-year-old (sic) son saw his dead father, he burst out into uncontrollable weeping."

=== Removal of tombstone ===
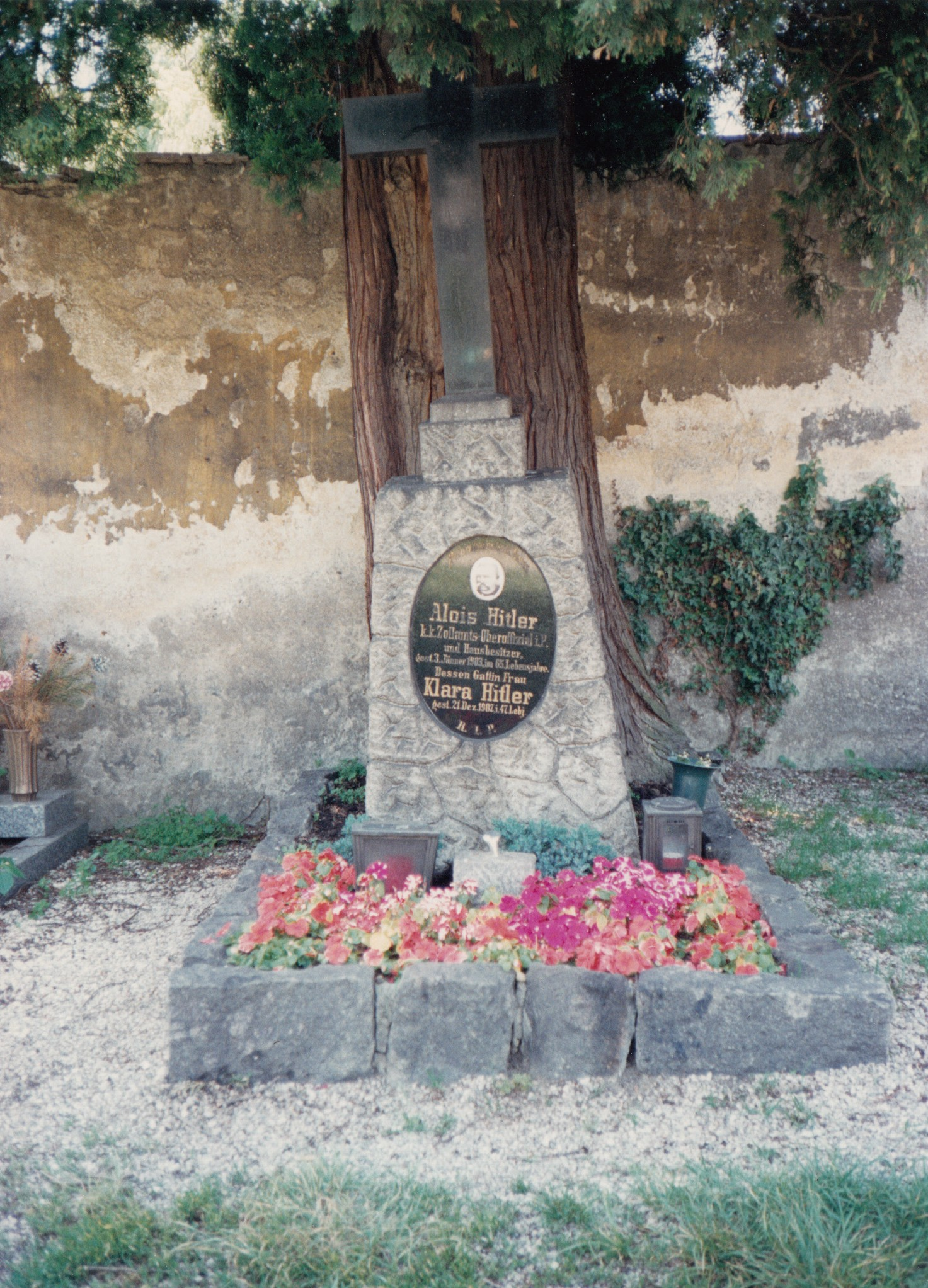
The tombstone of Alois & Klara Hitler, photographed c. 1984

On 28 March 2012, by the account of Kurt Pittertschatscher, the pastor of the parish, the tombstone marking Alois Hitler's grave and that of his wife Klara was removed. The decision was made by a descendant of the family, according to the local mayor Walter Brunner. The descendant is said to be "an elderly female relative of Alois Hitler's first wife, Anna". The removal was welcomed by local authorities, due to issues with the upkeep of the grave, as well as the fact that the grave was being "misused for gatherings of sympathisers". In 2011, for example, a vase was left at the site with the word "unvergesslich" (unforgettable), with the two s-letters marked in the style of the doppelte Siegrune associated with the SS. The Upper Austrian Network Against Fascism also approved of the removal, calling it a "welcome success", with Robert Eiter from the organization commenting that "a lot of flowers and wreaths were deposited there from people who clearly were admirers".

Since the rights to the burial plot have relinquished, it can now be re-assigned. A stonemason was employed to remove the old headstone, and the plot was covered in white gravel and a tree, which has since been removed. It is not known whether the remains of Adolf Hitler's parents are still interred there.

== In popular culture ==
On screen, Alois Hitler has been portrayed by:

- Helmut Griem in the Tales of the Unexpected episode "Genesis and Catastrophe" (1980)
- James Remar in The Twilight Zone episode "Cradle of Darkness" (2002)
- Ian Hogg in Hitler: The Rise of Evil (2003)

== See also ==
- Hitler family
