= Shopping City Süd =

- Location: Vösendorf, Austria
- Coordinates: 48°6′30″N 16°19′1″E
- Address: Shopping City Süd; 2334 Vösendorf
- Opened: 1976
- Developer: Hans Dujsik
- Owner: Unibail-Rodamco-Westfield
- Num. of stores: 330
- Floor area: 235,000 square metres (2,500,000 sq ft)
- Floors: 2 (main levels)
- Parking: 10,000
- Public transit: Badner Bahn
- Website: www.scs.at

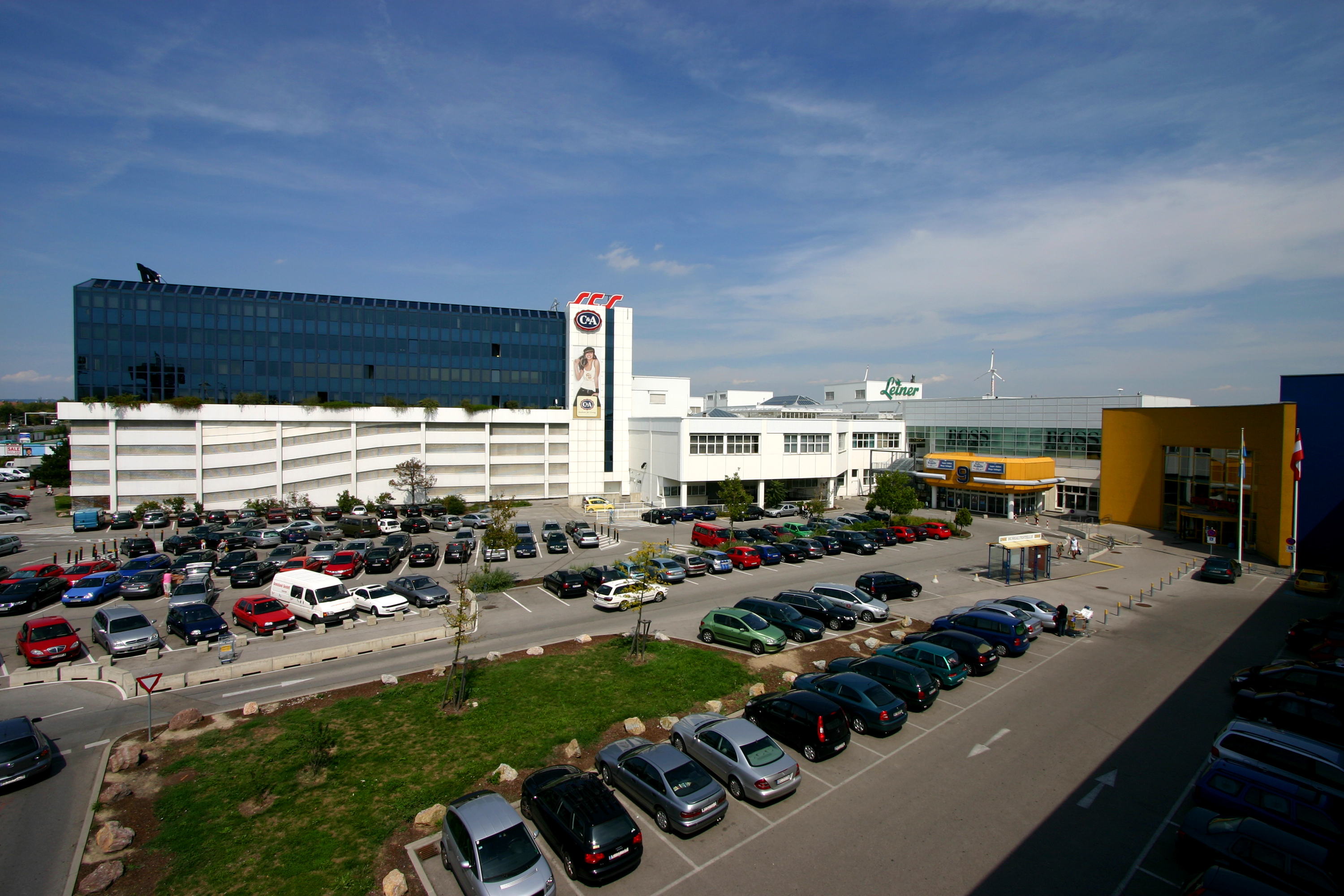
SCS Bürocenter office building (left) and IKEA Vösendorf (right). Photo taken in August 2007.

The Shopping City Süd (SCS) is a shopping centre located in Vösendorf and Wiener Neudorf, south of Vienna, Austria.

With a leasable area of 235,000 m^{2} (2,530,000 sq ft), it is the biggest shopping mall in Austria. It contains over 330 shops and has around 5,000 employees (2016).

In December 2007, the SCS was sold for €607 million to French real estate company Unibail-Rodamco-Westfield, which also owns the Donau Zentrum.

== History ==
The Shopping City Süd was built outside the borders of Vienna to save costs. As a result, a lot of purchasing power flows from Vienna to Lower Austria.

Since 2011, the SCS has also been a member of the Austrian Climate Alliance and aims to reduce its CO_{2} emissions by 5,300 tonnes as part of its membership.

After the death of the founder Hans Dujsik, the SCS was transferred to a foundation. In December 2007, the SCS was sold to the Dutch real estate group Unibail-Rodamco-Westfield, which also owns the Donauzentrum in Vienna. The purchase price, which was initially kept secret, is believed to have been 607 million euros, according to the Austrian Textile Newspaper. In 2021, Crédit Agricole Assurances, the insurance subsidiary of the French banking group Crédit Agricole, acquired 45% of the SCS.

The name "Shopping City Süd" was changed to "Westfield Shopping City Süd" in September 2021.

== Stores ==
The Shopping City South comprises around 330 shops with 4,500 employees. It was primarily designed for car traffic when it was built and offers more than 10,000 parking spaces.

== Access ==
The light rail station Vösendorf SCS of the Badner Bahn is located right in front of SCS. In addition, SCS is located just beside the junction of the Süd Autobahn (A2) and the Wiener Neustädter Straße (B17).

Public transport is mainly provided by the Badner Bahn, but there are also a few bus lines, such as a direct connection from Vienna, Siebenhirten (U6)–SCS ("SCS bus"), which can be used free of charge by those travelling from outside Vienna, and the regional bus lines 207 (towards Mödling station (S-Bahn) or Siebenhirten underground station (U6) and Vienna Liesing station (S-Bahn)) and 265 (towards Mödling station (S-Bahn) or Vienna Südtiroler Platz (Vienna main station, S-Bahn, underground station U1)).

The free bus line Oper–SCS ("Ikea bus") has been discontinued; since 2 October 2012, holders of the SCS customer card can use the Badner Bahn from Vienna without a ticket for the section Vösendorf-Siebenhirten–Vösendorf-SCS (outer zone).

There have been repeated calls to extend the U6 line to the SCS since 2007.

== See also ==
- List of the world's largest shopping malls
- List of shopping malls in Austria
