= Messepark =

Shopping centre in Vorarlberg, Austria

Coordinates: 47°24′41″N 09°42′45″E

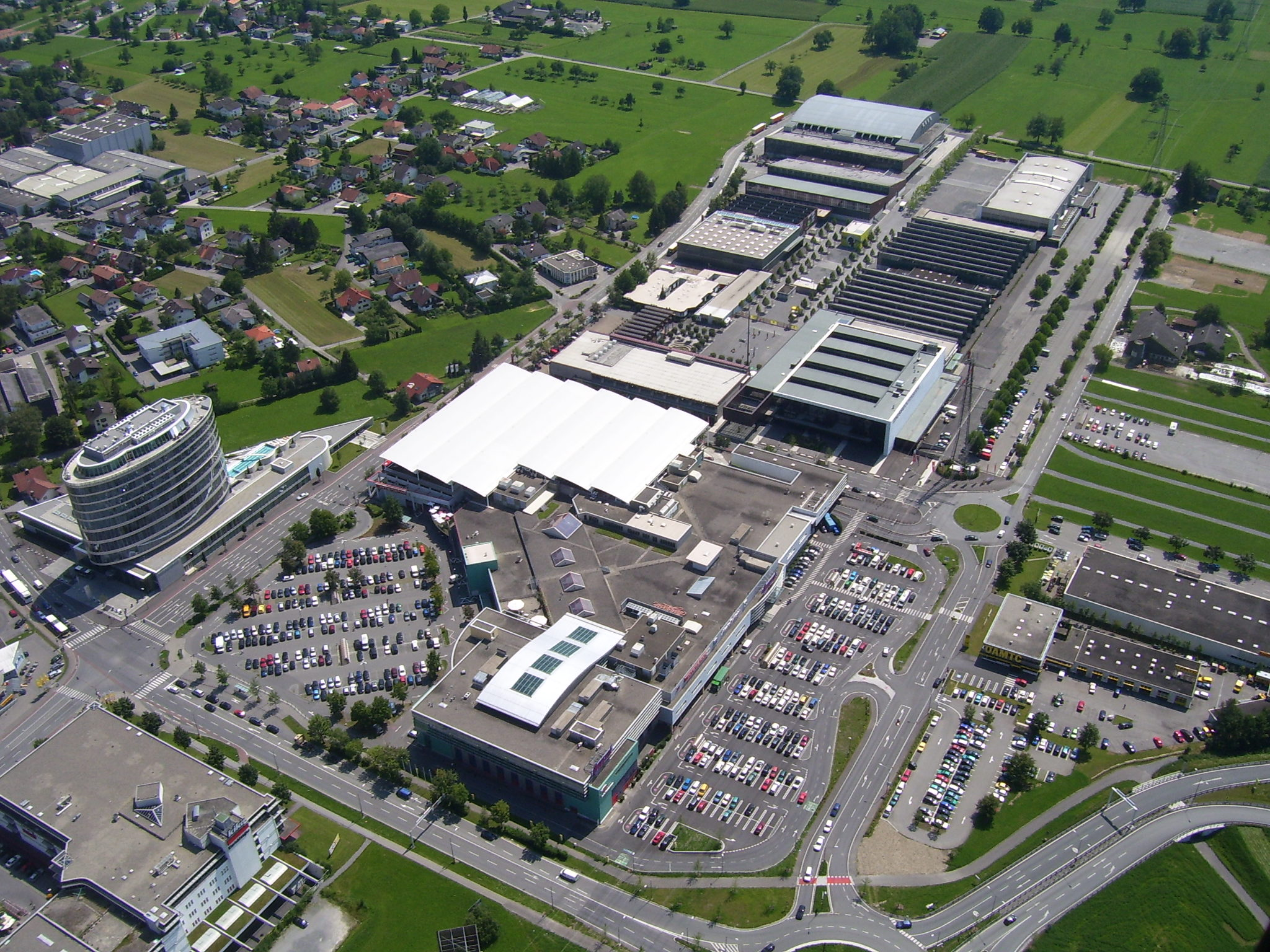
Messepark seen from above.

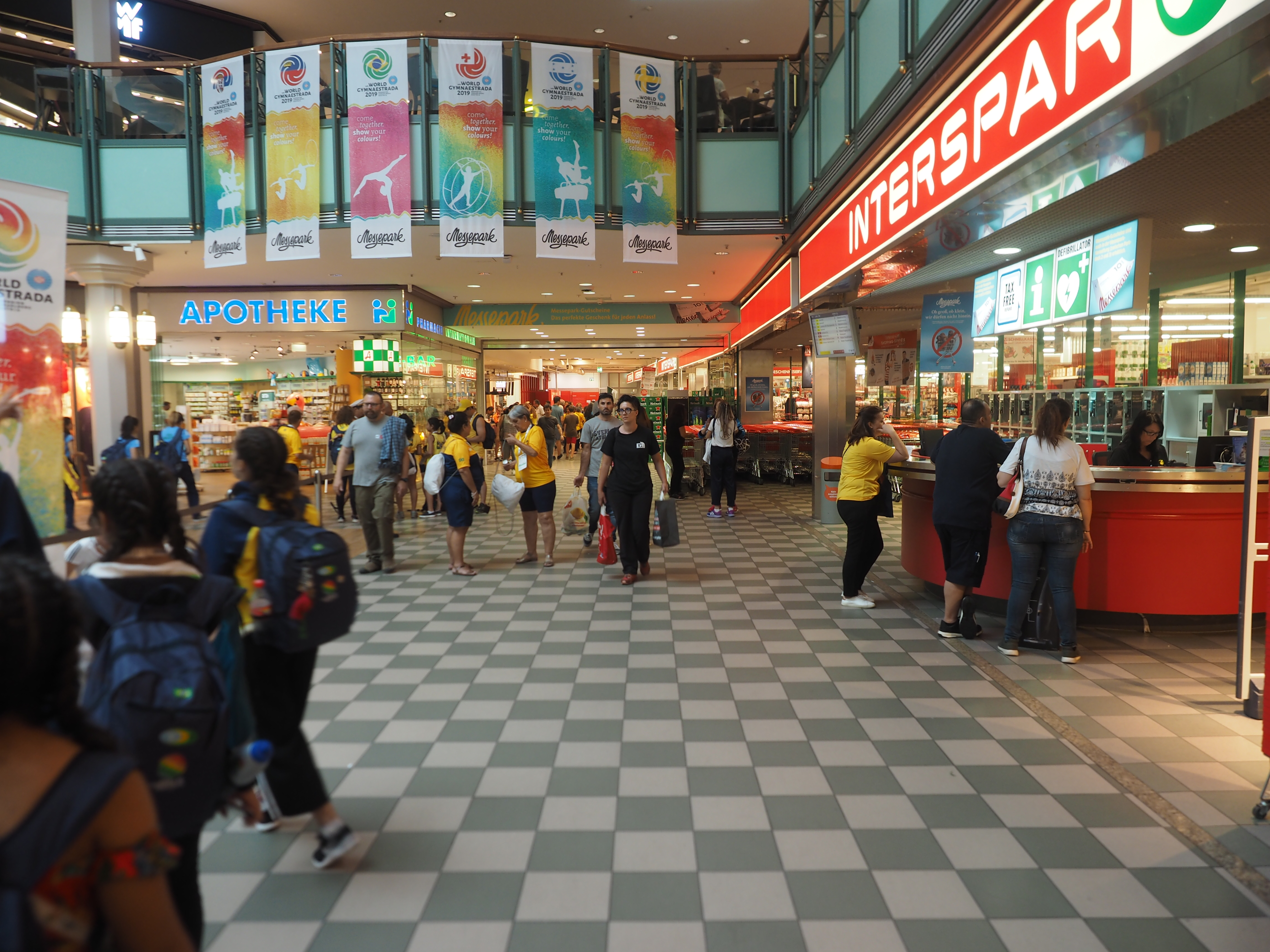
Interior of Messepark.

Messepark is the largest shopping centre in Vorarlberg, Austria. It is located in Dornbirn right next to the Dornbirn exhibition area and the highway leading south of Dornbirn.

== History ==
Messepark was opened on 19 March 1987. It was renovated to its current state from 1997 to 1998.

== Figures ==
Messepark is the largest shopping centre in Vorarlberg and one of the largest in the whole country of Austria. The total floor area is 41 thousand square metres, of which 19 thousand are used by 65 different retail shops. The sales per unit area are around 10,295 euro per square metre of business area. Judging by this criterion, Messepark has the largest sales in Austria. The businesses in Messepark employ about 950 people in total. The total annual revenue in 2019 was 195.6 million euro and the number of visitors was 17,600 per day.

Messepark is the first shopping centre in Austria and in the Lake Constance to have an ecological certificate. The largest solar panels in Vorarlberg are located on the roof of Messepark. They have a total area of 7650 square metres and consist of 4500 modules, with a total output of 1400 kilowatts.

There are four charging stations for electric-drive cars, of which two are express charging stations. There are 24 charging stations for electrical bicycles.
