= UNO Shopping =

Shopping mall in Leonding, Austria

Coordinates: 48°15′01″N 14°14′46″E

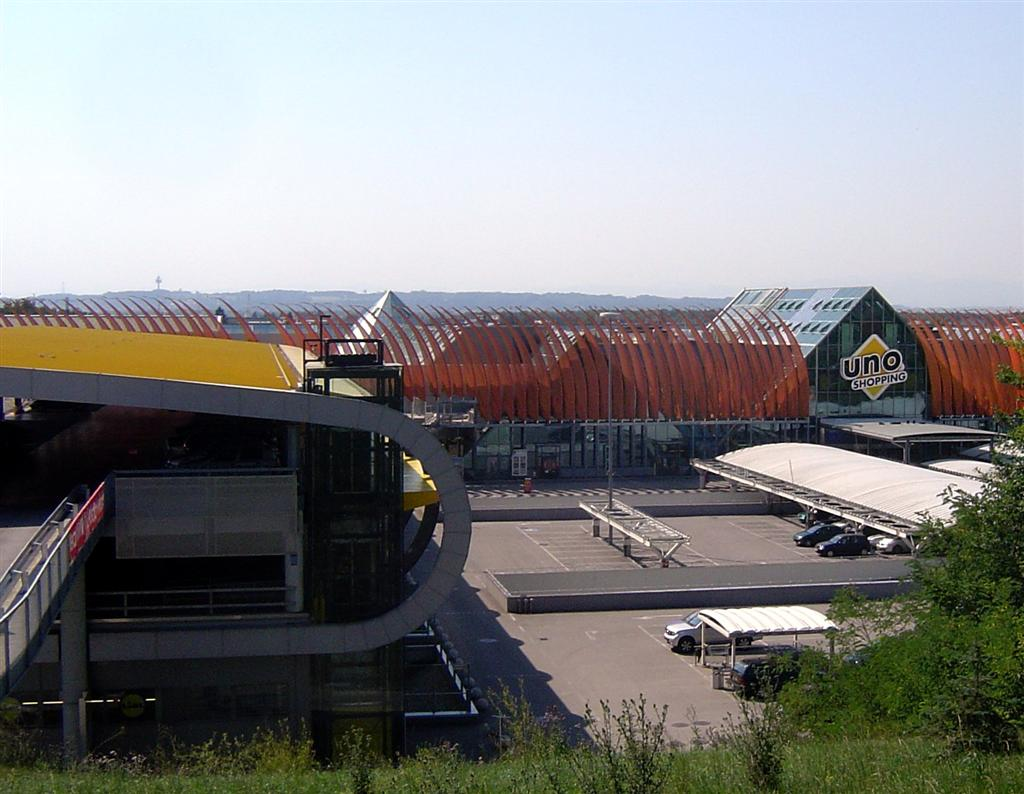
UNO Shopping

The UNO Shopping was a shopping mall in Leonding, Upper Austria and is located southwest of Linz. It was opened on 16 October 1990. In 2007, the mall had a revenue of 145 Million Euro. Since July 2012, the mall is empty with the exception of an apothecary and a consumer electronic retailer in an external part of the complex.

UNO Shopping closed in the summer of 2014 after gradually losing its tenants.
