= City-Arkaden =

Shopping centre in Carinthia, Austria

Coordinates: 46°37′39″N 14°18′34″E

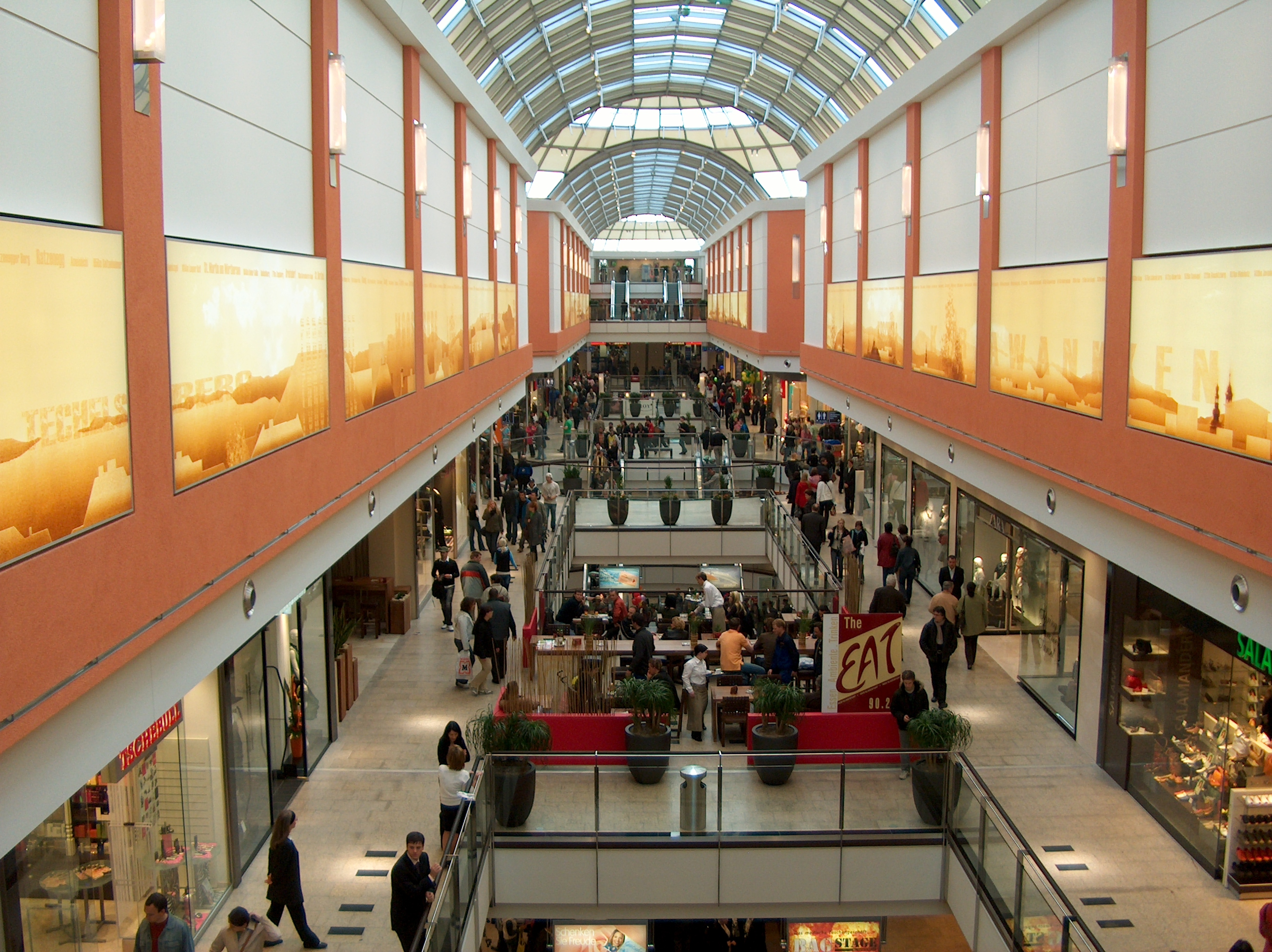
Interior of City-Arkaden.

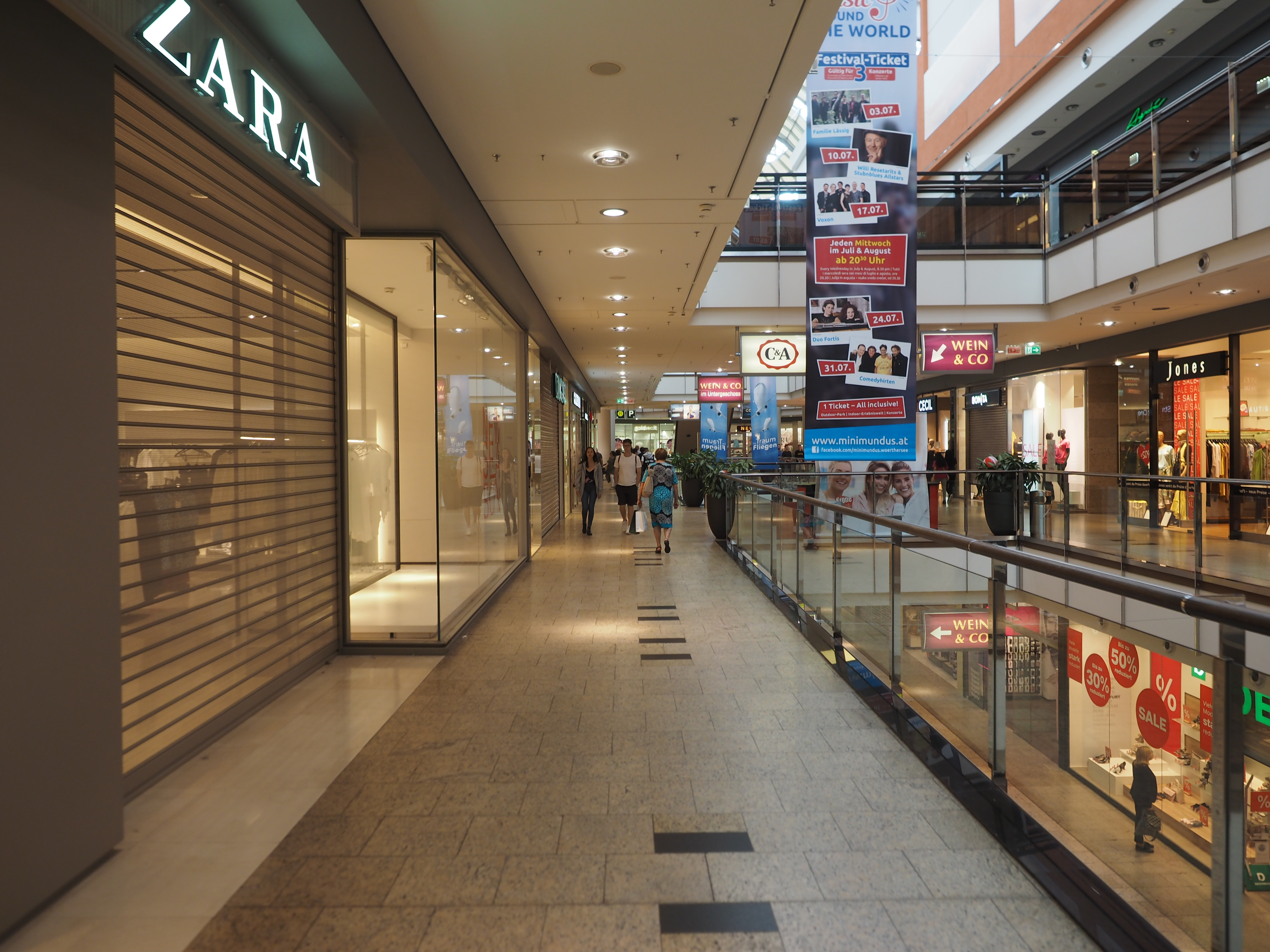
Interior of City-Arkaden.

City-Arkaden is a shopping centre in Klagenfurt, Carinthia, Austria. In terms of area, the centre is the second largest shopping centre in Carinthia, after Atrio in Villach, and is located at the northern edge of the centre of Klagenfurt.

After a year and half of construction, City-Arkaden was opened on St. Velter Ring on 28 March 2006. Planning and construction of the centre encountered some resistance from a part of the population, who criticised the centre for failing an environmental impact assessment test and the neglect towards the southern part of the city centre during the construction. The 19th-century industrial buildings of Julius Christoph Neuner's leather factory had to be dismantled to make way for the centre. They had been empty for decades.

The shopping centre consists of three floors with over 110 businesses, cafés and restaurants with a total shopping area of 30 thousand square metres. There are about 880 for-pay parking spaces on two floors. Two prevent traffic congestion, St. Veiter Ring was widened to four lanes in the area around City-Arkaden. Directly in front of the main entrance is the bus stop "Heuplatz" where the Klagenfurt city buses 40 and 41 stop every 7 to 15 minutes in directions of the Klagenfurt railway station, Annabichl and Feschnig.

Of the businesses in City-Arkaden, 40 opened their first premises in Carinthia in the centre, 15 of them even their first premises in Austria. The shopping centre is managed by the ECE Group from Hamburg, Germany. The shopping centre is owned by Deutsche EuroShop.

A similar shopping centre is also located in Wuppertal, North Rhine-Westphalia, Germany. However, the shopping centre in Wuppertal was not integrated into an existing building complex, but was built from scratch. Because of this it has a different selection of businesses and gastronomic services.
