= Badner Bahn =

Coordinates: 48.0994°N 16.3149°E

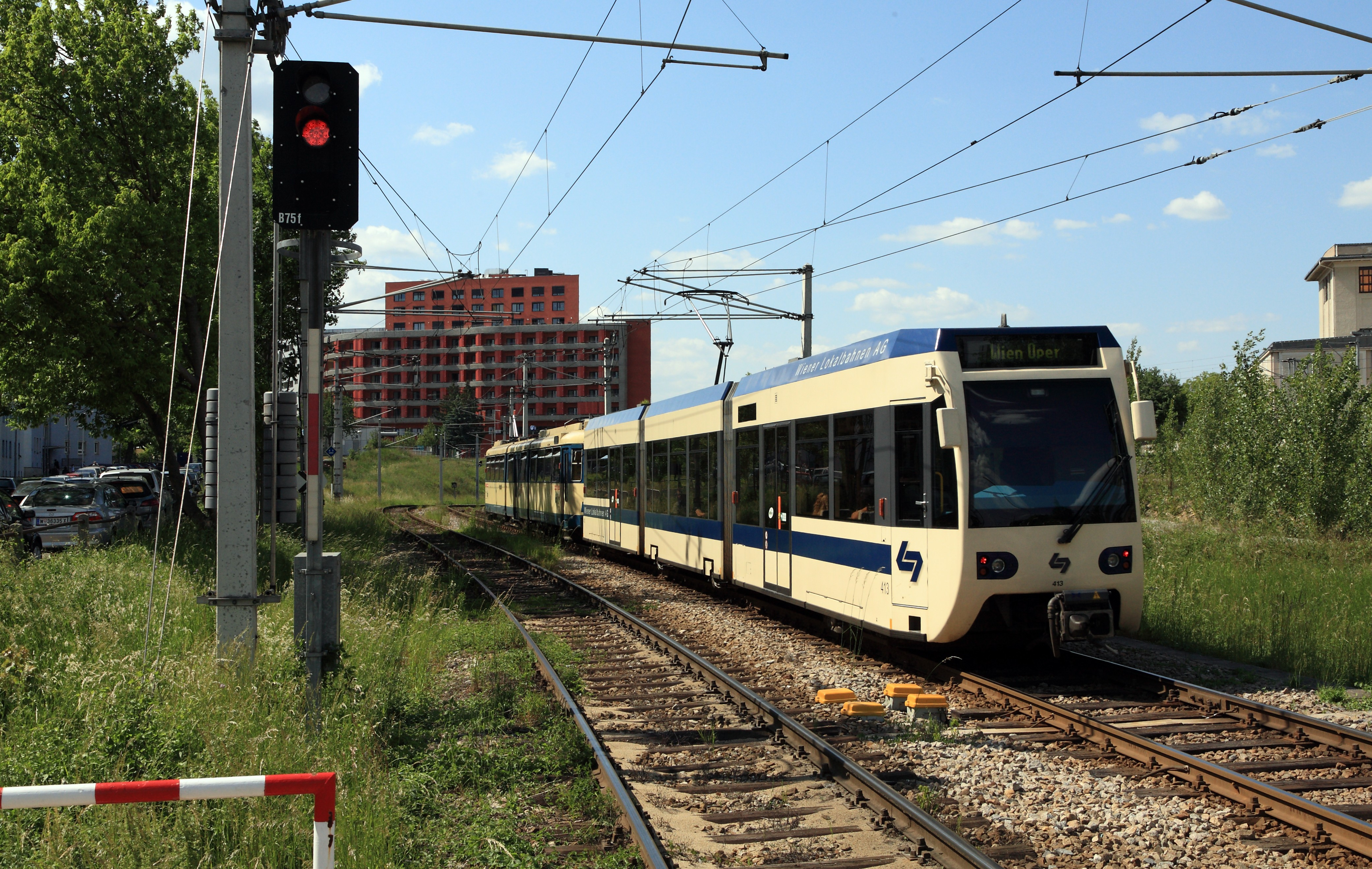
- A mixed class 100/400 train leaving the Schöpfwerk railway station

Overview
- Other name: Wiener Lokalbahn
- Status: Open
- Locale: Vienna metropolitan area
- Stations: 36

Service
- Type: Tram-train
- System: Verkehrsverbund Ost-Region
- Operator: Wiener Lokalbahnen
- Depots: Wolfganggasse; Inzersdorf Lokalbahn; Leesdorf
- Rolling stock: Class 100; Class 400; Class 500
- Daily ridership: 35,000

History
- Opened: 1873

Technical
- Line length: 30.4 km (18.9 mi)
- Track gauge: 1,435 mm (4 ft 8 1/2 in) standard gauge
- Operating speed: Oper–Schedifkaplatz: 60 km/h; Schedifkaplatz–Baden: 80 km/h

The Badner Bahn or Wiener Lokalbahn is a tram-train service in the metropolitan area of Vienna. It runs for 30.4 kilometres (18.9 mi) between Vienna and Baden, and is operated by the Wiener Lokalbahnen Aktiengesellschaft. The entire Badner Bahn is part of the Verkehrsverbund Ost-Region and is one of the most important passenger services owned by WLB. In 2013, 35,000 passengers per day used the service.

== Route ==
Starting from the Vienna State Opera, the service uses the tracks of Vienna's tram network as far as the Schedifkaplatz tram stop in the Meidling district, including parts of a tram tunnel. From Schedifkaplatz to Leesdorf in Baden and between Leesdorf and Josefsplatz, the train service has its own infrastructure, 25 kilometres (16 mi) of double-track light rail and 2 kilometres (1.2 mi) of tram line, respectively. These tracks are owned and maintained by Wiener Lokalbahnen.

Since 14 December 2014, there is a new train station at the state clinical center (German: Landesklinikum) in Baden. Despite its addition to the route, the length of a journey could be kept at 62 minutes.

From April until November 2024, trains will be diverted from their normal northern terminus due to construction. During this time, trains end at Quartier Belvedere station, near Wien Hauptbahnhof.

== Rolling stock ==
Original 26 class 100 high-floor units built between 1979 and 1993 by Simmering-Graz-Pauker served the line. In order to provide headways of 7.5 minutes 14 low-floor class 400 units were ordered from Bombardier, they were produced from 2000 to 2010 and put in operation as double-unit trains with a class 100 units to provide accessibility. In December 2018 Wiener Lokalbahnen presented the new class 500 Flexity trams designed by Bombardier Transportation (now part of Alstom), 18 trains were ordered with an option for 16 more, 12 of those were taken in 2023. The new trams will replace all remaining class 100 units of which only 10 are still in service.

Class	Built	Numbers	Cars	Length	Width	Weight	Power	Max. speed
100	1979, 1983, 1987, 1989, 1991–1993	101–126	10 (16 decommissioned)	26.750 m	2.40 m	37 t	2 x 190 kW	80 km/h (limited to 78 km/h)
400	2000, 2006, 2009–2010	401–414	14	26.942 m	2.50 m	35 t	4 x 100 kW	80 km/h
500	2021–2024	501–530	18+12 (+4 option)	27,82 m	2.55 m	42 t	4 x 110 kW	80 km/h

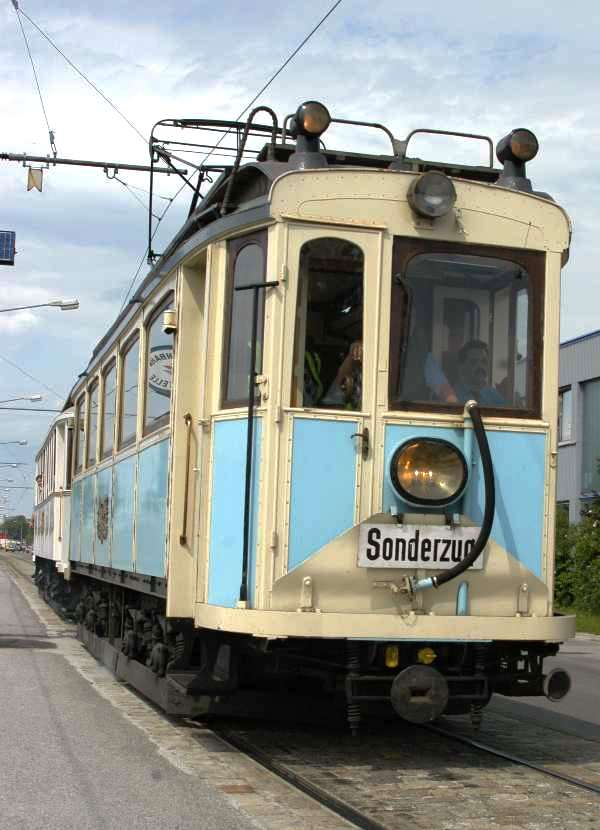
historical trainset

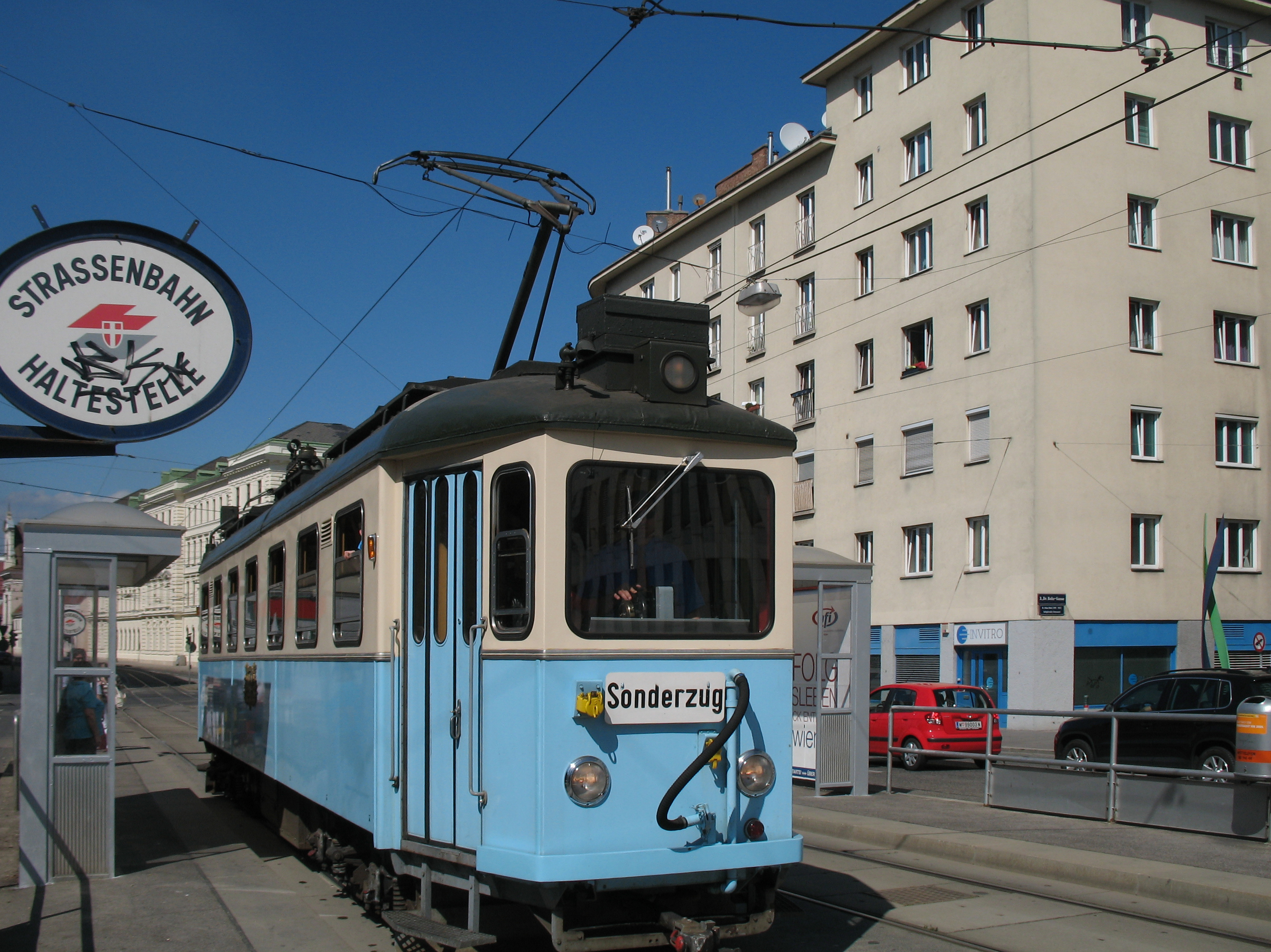
historical trainset

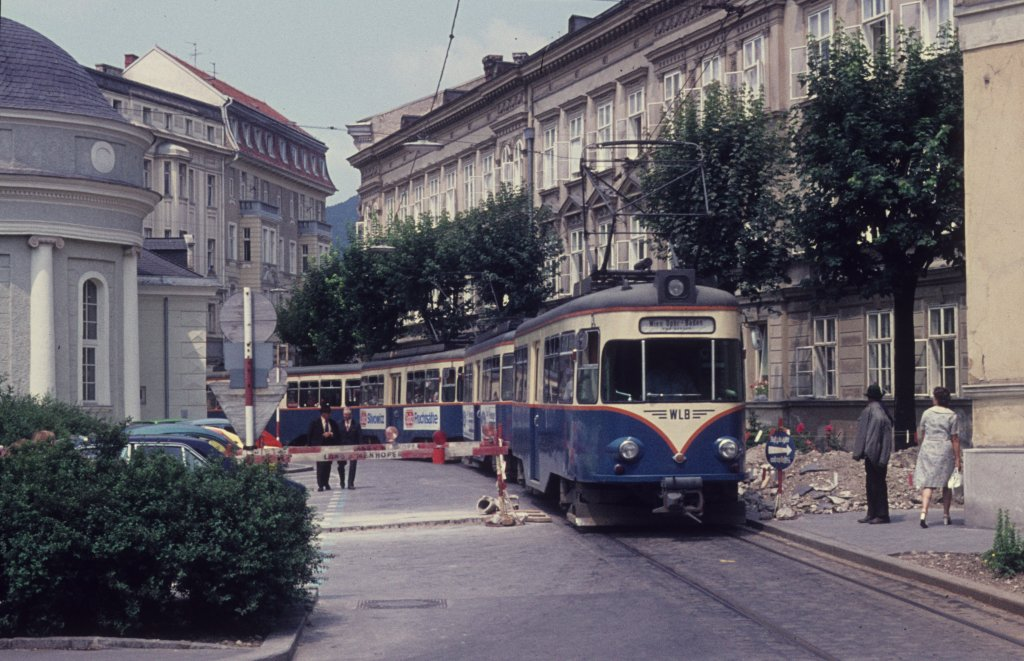
trainset from Cologne

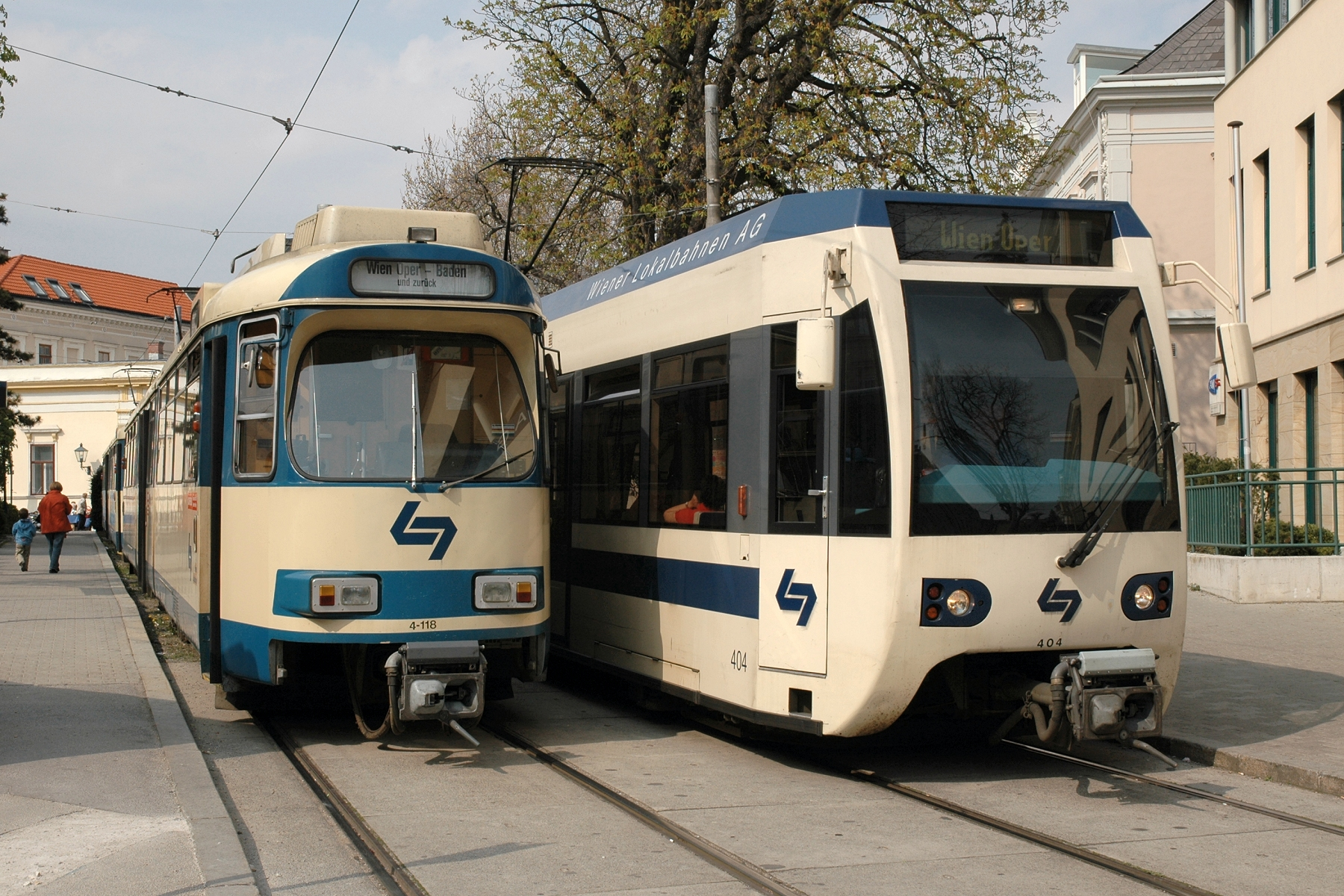
class 100 and 400 trainsets

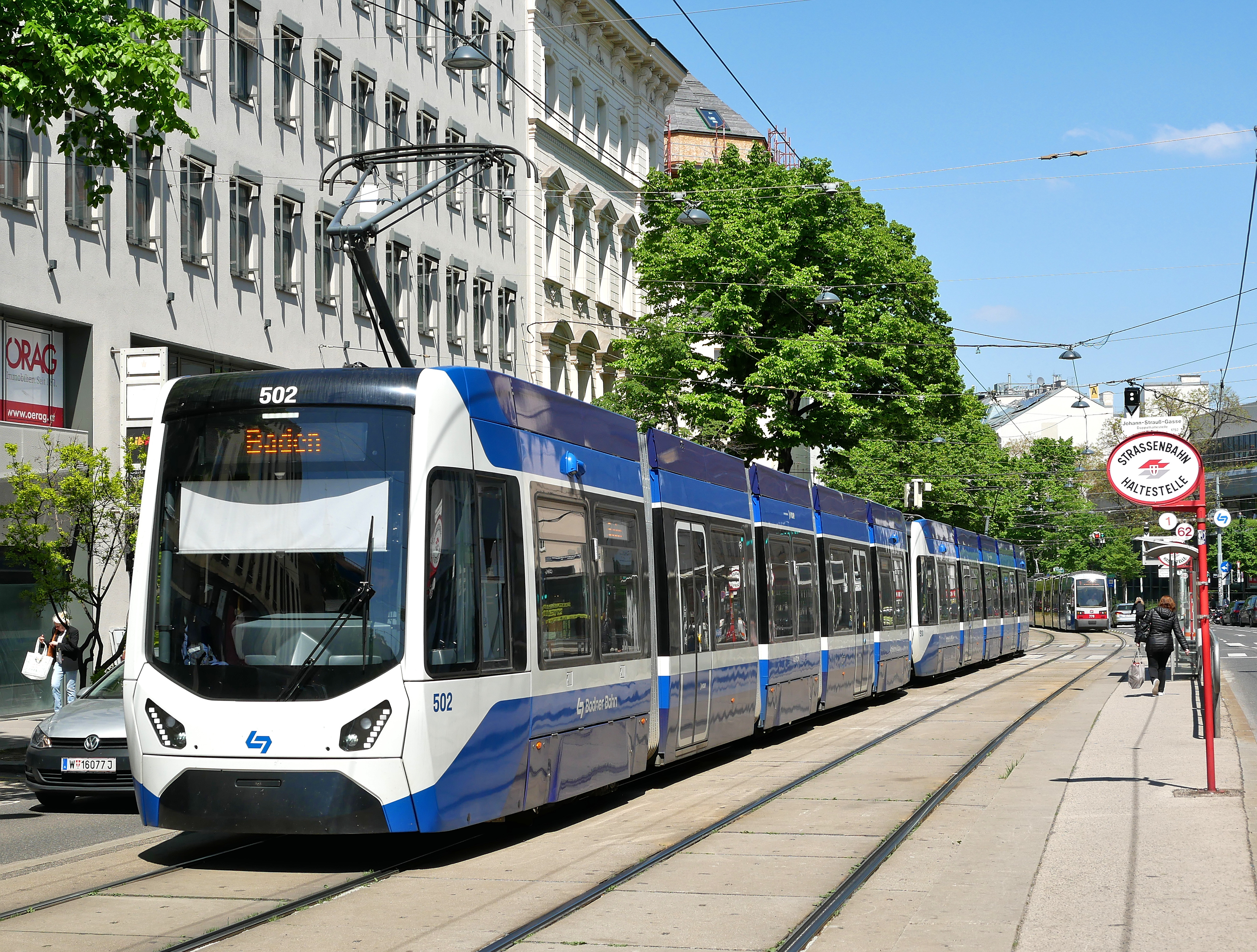
class 500 trainset
