= Leonding =

- Municipality
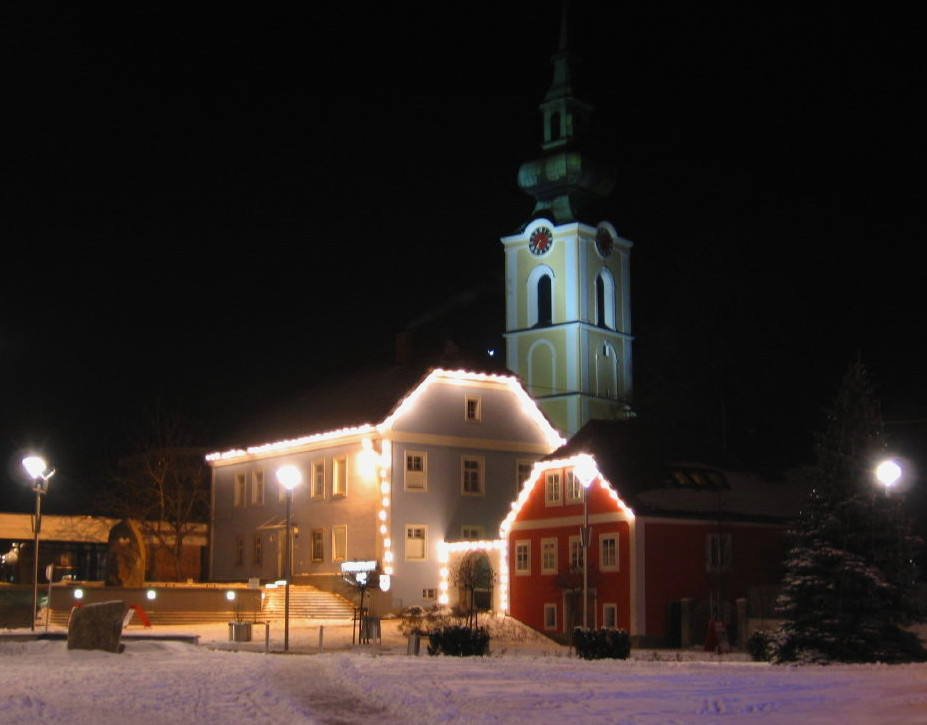
- Saint Michael's church, Leonding

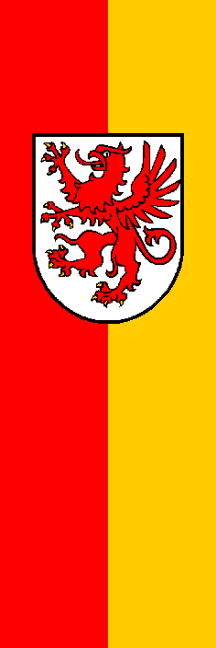
- Flag Coat of arms

- Location within Austria
- Coordinates: 48°16′0″N 14°15′0″E
- Country: Austria
- State: Upper Austria
- District: Linz-Land

Government
  - Mayor: Walter Brunner (SPÖ)

Area
  - Total: 24.04 km^{2} (9.28 sq mi)
- Elevation: 289 m (948 ft)

Population (2018-01-01)
  - Total: 28,698
  - Density: 1,194/km^{2} (3,092/sq mi)
- Time zone: UTC+1 (CET)
  - Summer (DST): UTC+2 (CEST)
- Postal code: 4060
- Area code: 0732
- Vehicle registration: LL
- Website: www.leonding.at

Leonding (German pronunciation: [ˈleːɔ̯nd̥iŋ]) is a town southwest of Linz in the Austrian state of Upper Austria. It borders Puchenau and the river Danube in the north, Wilhering and Pasching in the west, Traun in the south and Linz in the east. Leonding is the most populous town of the Linz-Land district and the fourth most populous town in Upper Austria.

It is very close to Linz and offers views of the Alps and therefore attracts the upper social classes for living without providing much infrastructure on its own. Due to the proximity of Linz and transport connections (like West railway, Westautobahn, B1 Wiener Straße or Linz Airport) it attracts companies like Rosenbauer, Ebner Industrieofenbau, Poloplast and Neuson. Other major employers are the UNO Shopping Centre (approximately 850 jobs) as well as the Plus City Shopping Centre (approximately 2200 jobs).

From 1898 to 1905 Adolf Hitler lived in Leonding where he attended the local primary school and later a grammar school in nearby Linz. The graves of his parents Alois and Klara are in Leonding. His brother Edmund, who died of measles, was buried there too. A delegation of Passau National Socialists visited the family's grave illegally. Hitler visited the grave in 1938. In 2012, when a relative of Alois Hitler's first wife, Anna, did not renew the lease, the grave was dissolved.

In 1903, Hitler's father died when drinking a glass of wine in a guesthouse in Leonding.

Leonding is split up into 22 localities: Aichberg, Alharting, Berg, Bergham, Buchberg, Doppl, Enzenwinkl, Felling, Friesenegg, Gaumberg, Haag, Hart, Holzheim, Imberg, Jetzing, Leonding, Reith, Rufling, St. Isidor, Staudach, Untergaumberg and Zaubertal.

== Population ==
Historical population
Year	Pop.	±%
1869	2,250	—
1880	2,378	+5.7%
1890	3,016	+26.8%
1900	3,829	+27.0%
1910	4,365	+14.0%
1923	4,762	+9.1%
1934	5,235	+9.9%
1939	5,771	+10.2%
1951	6,832	+18.4%
1961	11,211	+64.1%
1971	14,968	+33.5%
1981	19,389	+29.5%
1991	21,209	+9.4%
2001	22,203	+4.7%
2011	25,295	+13.9%
2018	28,698	+13.5%

The Town of Leonding grew rapidly since the year 2000 and the Population in 2018 was 28,698 jumping up from 22,203 in 2001. This rapid growth was mainly due to affordable, decently sized homes that were much cheaper than those in neighboring Linz. Leonding is also a very attractive living area for middle class Families which is another reason for the speedy growth.

Largest groups of foreign residents
Nationality	Population (2026)
Romania	719
Croatia	545
Bosnia and Herzegovina	520
Germany	437
Turkey	328
Hungary	240
Serbia	224
Syria	210
Ukraine	175
Afghanistan	149
Kosovo	129
Bulgaria	115
Poland	112
Italy	100
Russian Federation	92
North Macedonia	88
Slovenia	86
Slovakia	81
Iran	70
Czech Republic	69
Iraq	63

== Local council ==
The elections in 2015 showed the following results:

Party	Vote share	change	Seats in the Gemeinderat	change	Seats in the Stadtrat
SPÖ	33,84 %	9,23 %	13	-4	4
FPÖ	23,39 %	+ 9,92 %	9	+4	2
ÖVP	22,27 %	6,80 %	8	-3	2
The Greens - The Green Alternative	13,64 %	+ 2,05 %	5	+1	1
NEOS	5,97 %	+ 5,97 %	2	+2	0

Total: 37 seats

== Mayors ==
Mayors since 1945
Name	Party	Term of office
Josef Lehner	SPÖ	1946-1961
Franz Klafböck	SPÖ	1961-1968
Leopold Finster	SPÖ	1968-1982
Leopold Kronsteiner	SPÖ	1982-1997
Herbert Sperl	SPÖ	1997-2008
Walter Brunner	SPÖ	since 2008

== See also ==
- Oberösterreich
