= Vösendorf =

Vösendorf Vesnduaf
- Municipality
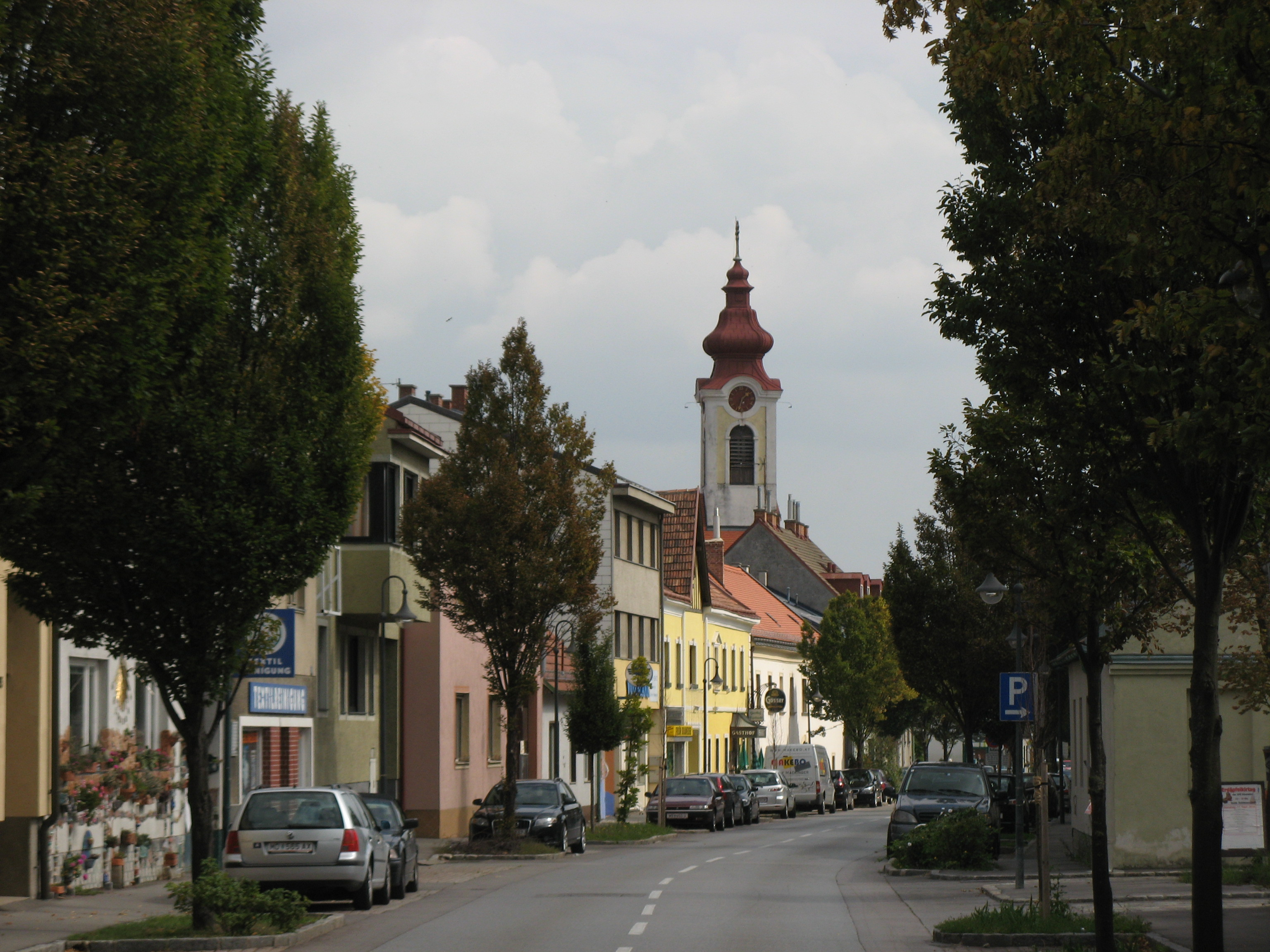
- Town center

- Coat of arms

- Location within Austria
- Coordinates: 48°7′N 16°20′E
- Country: Austria
- State: Lower Austria
- District: Mödling

Government
  - Mayor: Andrea Stipkovits (SPÖ)

Area
  - Total: 10.48 km^{2} (4.05 sq mi)
- Elevation: 194 m (636 ft)

Population (2018-01-01)
  - Total: 6,990
  - Density: 667/km^{2} (1,730/sq mi)
- Time zone: UTC+1 (CET)
  - Summer (DST): UTC+2 (CEST)
- Postal code: 2331
- Area code: 01
- Website: www.voesendorf.gv.at

Vösendorf (Central Bavarian: Vesnduaf) is a town in the district of Mödling in the Austrian state of Lower Austria. It's notable for the Shopping City Süd (Shopping City South), Austria's biggest shopping centre, located south of the city borders of Vienna.

== Population ==
Historical population
Year	Pop.	±%
1971	3,781	—
1981	3,703	−2.1%
1991	3,744	+1.1%
2001	4,899	+30.8%
2011	6,156	+25.7%
