= Oberfohren Memorandum =

Fraudulent Reichstag fire document

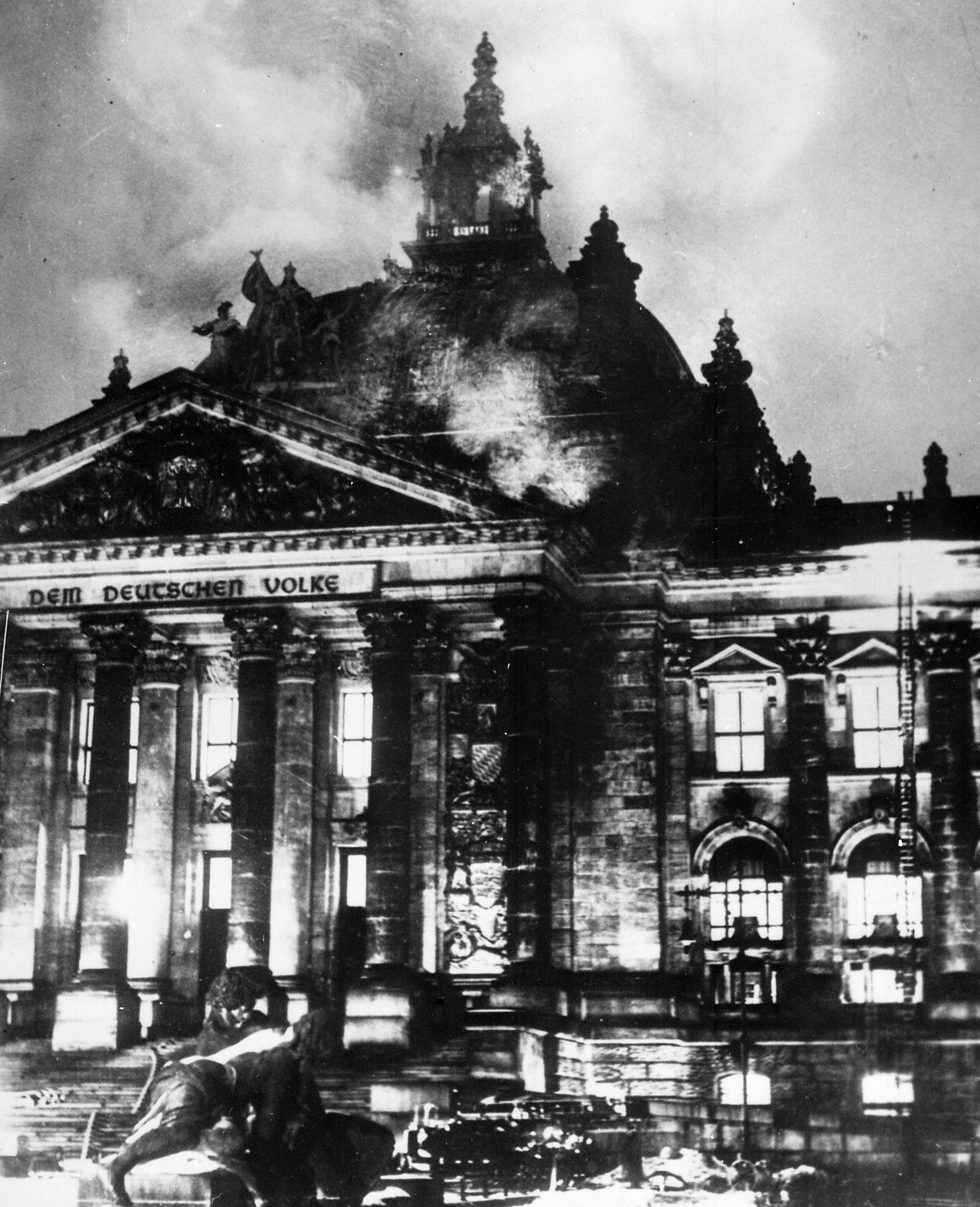
Reichstag fire of 27 February 1933

Allegedly authored in spring 1933 by German national-conservative politician Ernst Oberfohren, the Oberfohren Memorandum advocated that the Reichstag fire of 27 February 1933 had been planned by Hermann Göring and Joseph Goebbels and carried out by a group of Nazi officers. Although rejected as a fabrication by the Nazis, its origins remained mainly unclear until the end of World War II. From 1959 to 1962 author Fritz Tobias published his research in Der Spiegel magazine and in his work The Reichstag Fire: Legend and Truth, asserting that the document was a forgery, produced and circulated in 1933 by German Communist journalist émigrés in France.

== Overview ==
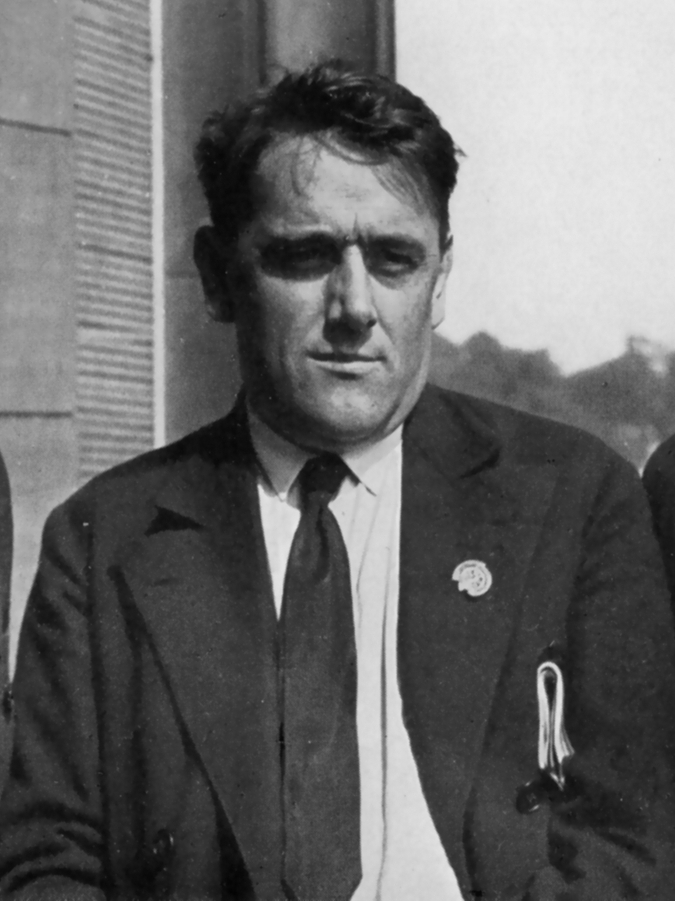
Willi Münzenberg

The memorandum was named after Ernst Oberfohren, chairman of the German National People's Party (German: Deutschnationale Volkspartei, DNVP) faction in the Reichstag. The DNVP was an alliance of nationalists, reactionary monarchists and antisemites supported by the Pan-German League, that constituted the largest and most powerful national-conservative party in Germany during the Weimar Republic until the rise and exclusive rule of the Nazi Party in July 1933.

By the end of March 1933 copies of the memorandum were already circulated in secret. An English journalist forwarded a copy to the United Kingdom. The Manchester Guardian published an article on 26 April 1933 that suggested the Reichstag fire had been a Nazi plot. The authors claimed their information was based on a memorandum they had received from a prominent conservative politician of Germany. The article asserted that the Government immediadetely attributed the fire to the Communists. At once false evidence was manufactured, ″thereby not inculpating but rather exculpating the Communists and deepening the suspicion felt by all objective observers that the real incendiaries were to be found within the Cabinet itself. Before the tribunal of history it is not the Communists, not the wretched van der Lubbe (the alleged perpetrator, who Hitler had threatened to execute before his guilt had been proven, even before he had been tried), but the German Government that is arraigned.″

The paper was denounced as a fake by the Nazis. Oberfohren, who had already resigned from office in late March, was found shot dead in his appartement on 7 May 1933. Then reported as a suicide, national and international observers alike assumed that the Nazis forced Oberfohren to commit suicide.

In an attempt to convince the international media that the Nazi Party was responsible for the fire, the full text, authored by a group of Communist journalists around Arthur Koestler, Willi Münzenberg, Otto Katz and Erich Wollenberg and published in August 1933 in Münzenberg's Paris publishing house, appeared in the Brown Book of the KPD. Münzenberg, who had still been in Berlin during the Reichstag fire night, immediately fled to Paris, was granted political asylum in France and with Comintern financial support acquired the publishing house Editions du Carrefour. The group was also responsible for the forged confession given by SA officer Karl Ernst.

According to the memorandum Ernst Oberfohren, in his capacity as chairman of the jointly governing German National People's Party had compiled irrefutable evidence, that identified the Nazis as the true instigators of the Reichstag arson. The argument regarding the fire was that it could not have been the work of a single person (Van der Lubbe) – but a group. ″The agents of Herr Göring, led by the Silesian SA leader, Reichstag-deputy Heines, entering the Reichstag through the heating-pipe passage coming from the palace of the President of the Reichstag, Hermann Göring. Every SA and SS leader was carefully selected and had a special station assigned to him. As soon as the outposts in the Reichstag signalled that the Communist deputies Torgler and Koenen had left the building, the SA troops set to work.″ According to the memorandum Marinus van der Lubbe might have been gay and was probably affiliated with SA leader Ernst Röhm, widely known to be homosexual.

== Trial & anti-trial ==
In July 1933, Marinus van der Lubbe, Ernst Torgler, Georgi Dimitrov, Blagoi Popov, and Vasil Tanev were indicted on charges of setting the Reichstag on fire and from 21 September to 23 December 1933, the Leipzig Trial, presided over by judges from the German Supreme Court (Reichsgericht) took place. Already dismissed as a fake, the memorandum was not taken note of.

Nonetheless, international media generally disagreed with the trial's verdict and a countertrial was held in London by a group of lawyers, democrats and other anti-Nazis under the aegis of German Communist émigrés. The chairman of the mock trial was British Labour Party barrister D. N. Pritt and the chief organiser was the KPD propaganda chief Willi Münzenberg. The other "judges" were Piet Vermeylen of Belgium; Georg Branting of Sweden; Vincent de Moro-Giafferi and Gaston Bergery of France; Betsy Bakker-Nort, a lawyer and member of parliament of the Netherlands for the progressive liberal party Free-thinking Democratic League; Vald Hvidt of Denmark; and Arthur Garfield Hays of the United States. It ended with the conclusion that the defendants were innocent and the true initiators of the fire were to be found amid the leading Nazi Party elite.

== After World War II ==
In 1951 the Lower Saxony interior ministry ordered author Fritz Tobias to undertake research on the event. Tobias came to the conclusion that the memorandum was a product of Muenzenberg's Paris publishing house. His history remains widely accepted as it was hardly ever contested by contemporary historians, mainly because he enjoyed a considerable degree of constitutional support from his employer. However, internationally the responsibility for the Reichstag fire remains a topic of debate and research.

== Bibliography ==
- Kershaw, Ian (1998). Hitler, 1889–1936: Hubris. London: Allen Lane.
- Tobias, Fritz (1964). The Reichstag Fire. New York: Putnam.
