= Willi Münzenberg =

German communist politician and activist (1889–1940)

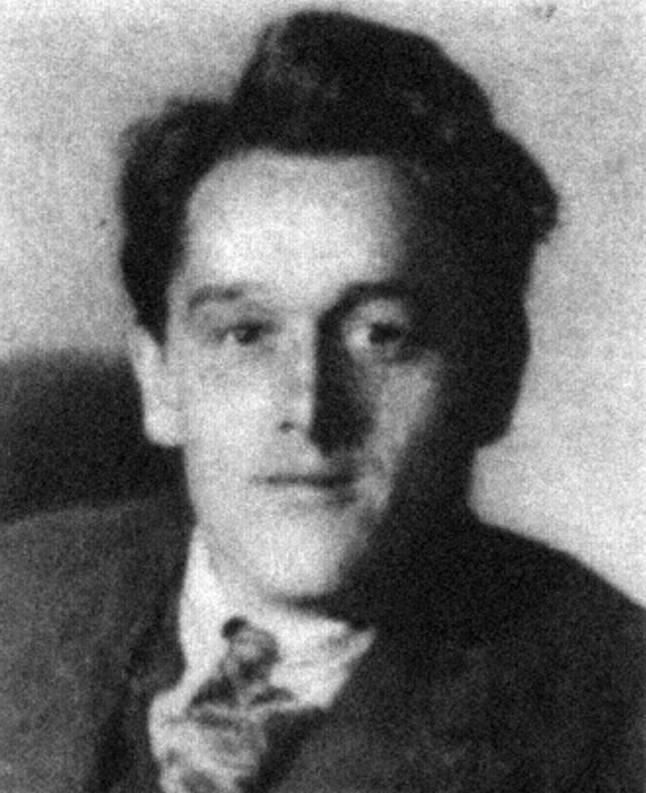
- Münzenberg c. 1924

International Secretary of the Young Communist International
- In office November 1919 – June 1921
- Preceded by: Office established
- Succeeded by: Voja Vujović

Member of the Reichstag for Hesse-Nassau
- In office 27 May 1924 – 28 February 1933
- Preceded by: Multi-member district
- Succeeded by: Constituency abolished

Personal details
- Born: Wilhelm Münzenberg; August 14, 1889 Erfurt, Province of Saxony, Prussia, German Empire
- Died: June 1940 (aged 50) Saint-Marcellin, France
- Party: SPD (before 1914); USPD (1914–1919); KPD (1919–1939)
- Other political affiliations: SP (1910s)
- Central institution membership: 1927–1938: Full member, KPD Central Committee

Wilhelm Münzenberg (14 August 1889 – June 1940) was a German communist activist and publisher who served as the first head of the Young Communist International from 1919 to 1921 and as a member of the Reichstag from 1924 to 1933. He also founded the famine relief and propaganda organization Workers International Relief in 1921.

He was a leading propagandist for the Soviet-allied Communist Party of Germany (KPD) during the Weimar Era, but later grew disenchanted with the Soviet Union due to Joseph Stalin's Great Purge of the 1930s. Condemned by Stalin to be purged and arrested for treason, Münzenberg left the KPD and in Paris became a leader of the German émigré anti-fascism and anti-Stalinist community until forced to flee the Nazi advance into France in 1940. Arrested and imprisoned by the Daladier government in France, he escaped prison camp only to be found dead a few months later in a forest near the commune of Saint-Marcellin, France. Walter Laqueur described him as "a cultural impresario of genius".

== Early years ==
Münzenberg was born 14 August 1889 in Erfurt, in the Prussian Province of Saxony (present-day Thuringia). The son of a tavern keeper and grandson of a baron from the House of Seckendorff, Münzenberg grew up in poverty. As a young man working in a shoe factory, he became involved with trade unions and in the Social Democratic Party of Germany (SPD). He gained his first experience as an organiser in 1907, when he attempted to organise apprentices in Erfurt with the local branch of the Union of Young German Workers, an activity which led to his brief imprisonment. He subsequently travelled through Germany in search of work, eventually reaching Zürich in Switzerland in 1910, where he stayed for the following eight years. Whilst there he initially gravitated towards anarchist politics, and studied the works of Peter Kropotkin and Mikhail Bakunin. He subsequently shifted back towards social democracy. When the SPD split in 1914 between the moderate Majority SPD (MSPD) and the radical Independent SPD (USPD) over the issue of World War I, Münzenberg sided with the USPD. In 1915, having already become leader of the Swiss socialist youth movement, he was elected secretary of the International Union of Socialist Youth Organizations, and was elected to the executive of the Social Democratic Party of Switzerland the following year. The same year he was also appointed editor of the publication of the International, Jugend-Internationale based in Zurich.

During World War I, Münzenberg often visited Vladimir Lenin at his home in Zürich, Switzerland. His activism would eventually come to the attention of the Swiss authorities, who imprisoned him twice before deporting him to Germany in November 1918. After arriving in Germany, Münzenberg joined the Spartacus League, and soon thereafter became one of the earliest members of the KPD. He was initially associated with the party's left wing, and at the party's founding congress in December 1918 he acted as spokesman for the opposition to Rosa Luxemburg and Paul Levi's proposal for the party to contest the 1919 German federal election. Münzenberg subsequently played a leading role in the Spartacist uprising in Stuttgart, leading a demonstration alongside Clara Zetkin and Edwin Hoernle against the city's Social Democratic government which declared it overthrown in favour of a Soviet. Following the failure of the uprising he was arrested and spent five months in prison before being tried alongside the other leaders of the Stuttgart Spartacist rebellion, which ended in their acquittal. Shortly afterwards he became chairman of the state KPD in Württemberg.

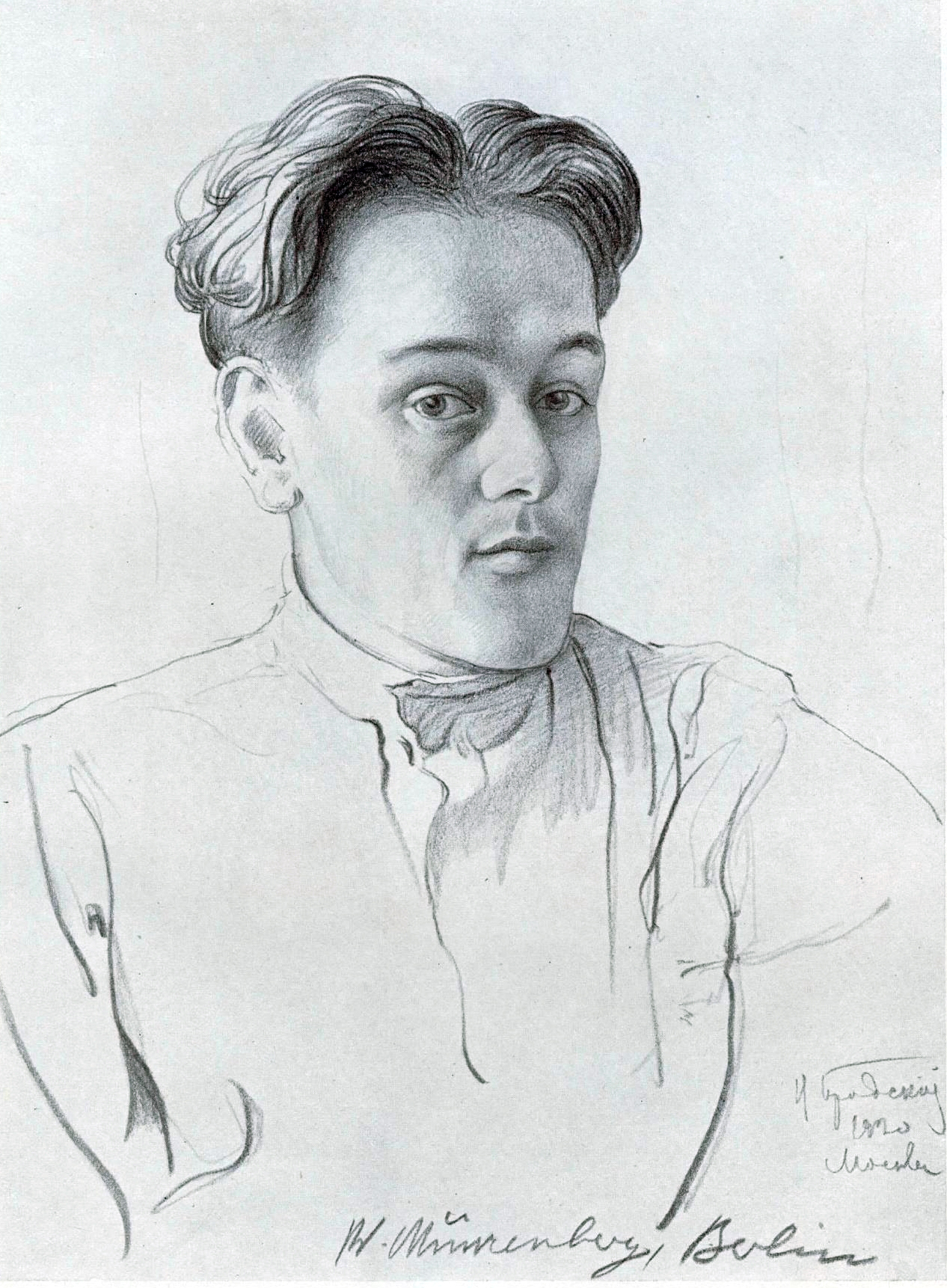
Portrait by Isaak Brodsky, 1920

In November 1919, Münzenberg convened a congress of the Socialist Youth International which voted to affiliate to the Comintern as the Young Communist International, with Münzenberg remaining at its head. He was also the delegate of the YCI to the 2nd World Congress of the Communist International in 1920. However, he was removed from his leadership role with the YCI the following year.

== Political career ==
In 1924, Münzenberg was elected to the Reichstag as a KPD member. He served until the KPD was banned in 1933. However, his parliamentary work was low profile: he did not play a leading role in debates and avoided factional struggle in public, preferring to concentrate on his propaganda work. Münzenberg was one of the few KPD leaders in 1933, and one of the few of working-class origin, which was a source of immense pride for him.

During the Weimar period, Münzenberg earned the reputation of a brilliant propagandist. His first major success was an effort to raise money and food for the victims of the Russian famine of 1921, a task which had been entrusted to him by Lenin after he was removed from the leadership of the Communist Youth International. Münzenberg was reputed to have raised millions of dollars for aid to the Soviet Union during the famine through his famous organization Internationale Arbeiter-Hilfe (IAH; "Workers International Relief"), based in Berlin. IAH's efforts were valuable not only for the practical help they offered in terms of famine relief, but also due to their propaganda value for the communist movement in Germany and around the world. IAH also owned the Moscow-based film studio Mezhrabpomfilm, which employed 400 members of staff and produced films by Soviet directors including Vsevolod Pudovkin and Nikolai Ekk. Their films, as well as other Soviet productions, were distributed in Germany by its subsidiary Prometheus-Filmgesellschaft, including Battleship Potemkin, which became a major hit in Germany after receiving a poor reception in the Soviet Union. Prometheus also produced films in Germany, such as Kuhle Wampe, whose script was co-written by Bertolt Brecht. In 1924 he launched Arbeiter-Illustrierte-Zeitung (AIZ), an illustrated weekly which became the most widely read socialist pictorial newspaper in Germany, achieving a circulation of almost half a million. AIZ was the most popular of a range of publications produced by Münzenberg, some of which were aimed at the Communist Party membership, but most of which were intended for a broader audience. After directing the Comintern's handling of the Sacco and Vanzetti case in 1925, Münzenberg took charge of the League Against Imperialism, created in Brussels in 1927. In addition, Münzenberg worked closely with the Comintern and the Soviet secret police (known as the Cheka in 1917–1922 and as the OGPU in 1922–1934) to advance the Communist cause internationally.

To broaden the Comintern's influence, Münzenberg created numerous front organizations, which he termed "Innocents' Clubs". These front groups, such the Friends of Soviet Russia, the League Against Imperialism and IAH were superficially devoted to undeniably benign or benevolent causes such as famine relief, anti-imperialism, or peace, but Münzenberg also used them to enlist the support of liberals and moderate socialists in defending the Bolshevik revolution. As he told a fellow Comintern member, "These people have the belief they are actually doing this themselves. This belief must be preserved at any price." The front organizations, in turn, helped fund the acquisition of the "Münzenberg Trust", a collection of small newspapers, publishing houses, movie houses, and theatres in locations around the world. Münzenberg, referred to by some as the "Red Millionaire", allegedly used the businesses to pay for a limousine and an elegantly furnished apartment for himself.

Although Münzenberg's network of organisations received funding from the Comintern and KPD, they were organisationally separate: publicly, Münzenberg argued that the IAH was a politically independent organisation, and more generally his enterprises rejected the use of Communist jargon and focused on communicating with potential sympathisers, deploying a range of propaganda techniques which would subsequently become more widespread during the 20th century, including sound trucks, radio broadcasts, phonograph records, and use of music and films. Whilst generally supporting the Communist Party line, his tactical approach in his propaganda work was more flexible than that of the party, in order to attract as broad a range of people as possible to his endeavours - although this was in conflict with the more sectarian approach of the Communist Party at the time, it foreshadowed the popular front tactic endorsed by Stalinists in the 1930s. Münzenberg defended his strategy against attacks by more orthodox Communists by arguing that it sought "to interest those millions of apathetic and indifferent workers, who take no part in political life... who simply have no ear for the propaganda of the Communist Party".

After the fracturing of the KPD's leading triumvirate of Ernst Thälmann, Heinz Neumann and Hermann Remmele in 1931, Münzenberg participated in a behind-the-scenes factional struggle, allying with Neumann, Remmele and Leo Flieg to advocate a refocusing of the party's attacks away from the Social Democrats and towards the Nazi Party, in opposition to Thälmann and Walter Ulbricht. The World Congress Against War was held in Amsterdam on 27–29 August 1932 and was attended by more than 2,000 delegates from 27 countries. Following the meeting, Münzenberg formed the permanent World Committee Against War and Fascism, based in Berlin. The Executive Committee of the Communist International was uncomfortable with Münzenberg's views and replaced him with Bulgarian Communist leader Georgi Dimitrov. Early the next year, Adolf Hitler was appointed chancellor of Germany. The World Committee had to move its headquarters to Paris and Münzenberg resumed the leadership.

Dimitrov, along with fellow Communists Blagoy Popov, Vasil Tanev, Ernst Torgler and Marinus van der Lubbe were arrested and tried on a charge of responsibility for the 1933 Reichstag fire. In response, Münzenberg published The Brown Book of the Reichstag Fire and Hitler Terror, which argued that the defendants were innocent and that responsibility for the fire lay with Hermann Göring and Joseph Goebbels, who planned to use the event to help consolidate Nazi power. The book also examined Van der Lubbe's mental health, disputed the forensic evidence presented regarding the fire, and discussed the Nazi regime's suppression of trade unions and artistic expression, anti-Semitic persecution, and use of torture against prisoners. By 1935 the book had been translated into 23 languages and had sold 600,000 copies. The book was published shortly before a counter-trial organised by The League Against Imperialism, which concluded that the Nazis had set the fire themselves. The counter-trial attracted sympathetic press coverage, and the German government unsuccessfully pressured the British to intervene and halt the proceedings. The counter-trial concluded one day before the trial began; under the pressure of international public opinion, the court found Dimitrov, Popov, Tanev, and Torgler not guilty.

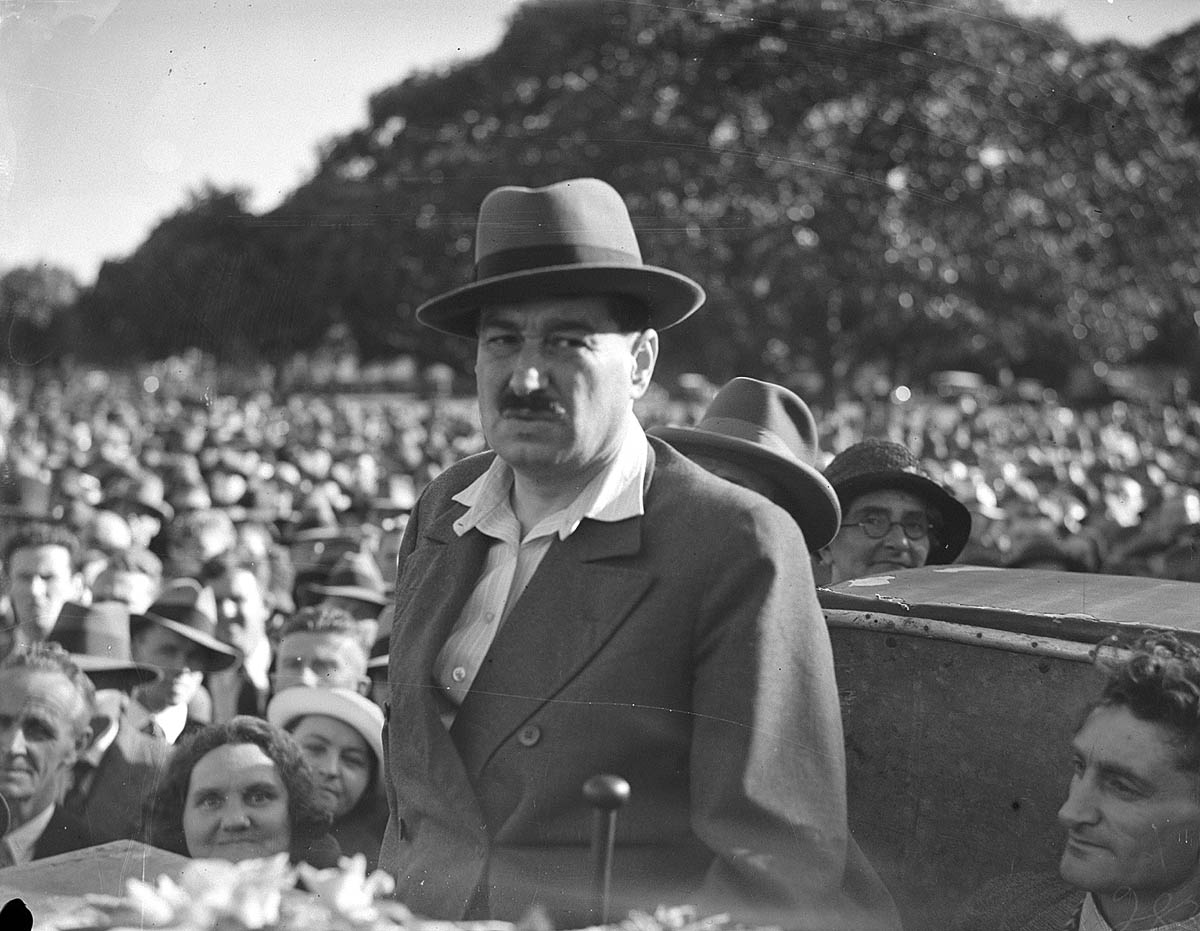
Münzenberg sent Czechoslovak writer Egon Kisch to Australia, where he addressed a crowd of 18,000 in Sydney's Domain, telling Australians of his firsthand experience with the dangers of Hitler's Nazi regime.

As he was barred from entering Britain at the time of the trial, Münzenberg went to the United States instead, where he spoke about and raised money for the campaign to free Thälmann from imprisonment. He toured the northeastern and midwestern US in June 1934 with his wife Babette Gross, sister of author Margarete Buber-Neumann; Welsh Labour figure Aneurin Bevan; and SPD lawyer Kurt Rosenfeld. Speaking at well-attended rallies at venues like Madison Square Garden and the Bronx Coliseum, he appeared alongside Sinclair Lewis and Malcolm Cowley. Later in 1934, Münzenberg's influence reached the antipodes when his Comintern machine sent Egon Kisch to the All-Australian Conference of the Movement Against War and Fascism (an Australian Communist Party front organization). What could have been a low-key visit from an unknown Czech writer quickly polarized Australian society when the Joseph Lyons government declared Kisch as "undesirable as an inhabitant of, or visitor to, the Commonwealth" and attempted to exclude Kisch from Australia. With the government unable to produce any legal proof that Kisch was a communist, its case collapsed, and Kisch became a popular speaker disseminating Münzenberg's Comintern message. However, attempts to foster a United Front against fascism in Australia eventually came to nothing.

Münzenberg instructed his assistant, fellow Comintern agent Otto Katz, to travel to the United States to garner support for various pro-Soviet and anti-Nazi causes, as part of the 1935 Comintern Seventh World Congress' proclamation of a "Peoples' Front Against Fascism", aka the Popular Front. Katz made his way to Hollywood, and in July 1936 he formed the Hollywood Anti-Nazi League with Dorothy Parker. Many artists and writers in the U.S. flocked to join the Popular Front, the Anti-Nazi League, and related groups such as the League of American Writers, and movie stars such as Paul Muni, Melvyn Douglas, and James Cagney all agreed to sponsor the Hollywood Anti-Nazi League.

Münzenberg lived intermittently in Paris from 1933 to 1940. He took a common-law wife, Babette Gross, a party member who had separated from her husband shortly after her marriage. Among the solidarity work he was involved with in the mid-1930s were the campaign to free Thälmann, the German Popular Front and organising aid for the Republicans during the Spanish Civil War. Münzenberg continued his publishing activities whilst in exile, founding Editions du Carrefour in Paris as a successor to his German publishing firm Neuer Deutscher Verlag. AIZ continued to be published, initially in Prague, whilst Carrefour published around a hundred books and many more pamphlets between 1933 and 1936. It has been suggested that during his years in exile, Münzenberg had some role in recruiting Kim Philby to work for the Soviet Union, but there is no clear evidence. The argument for the theory is that Philby was recruited to work for Soviet intelligence by one of the Münzenberg Trust's front organizations, the World Society for the Relief of the Victims of German Fascism based in Paris.

== Defection ==
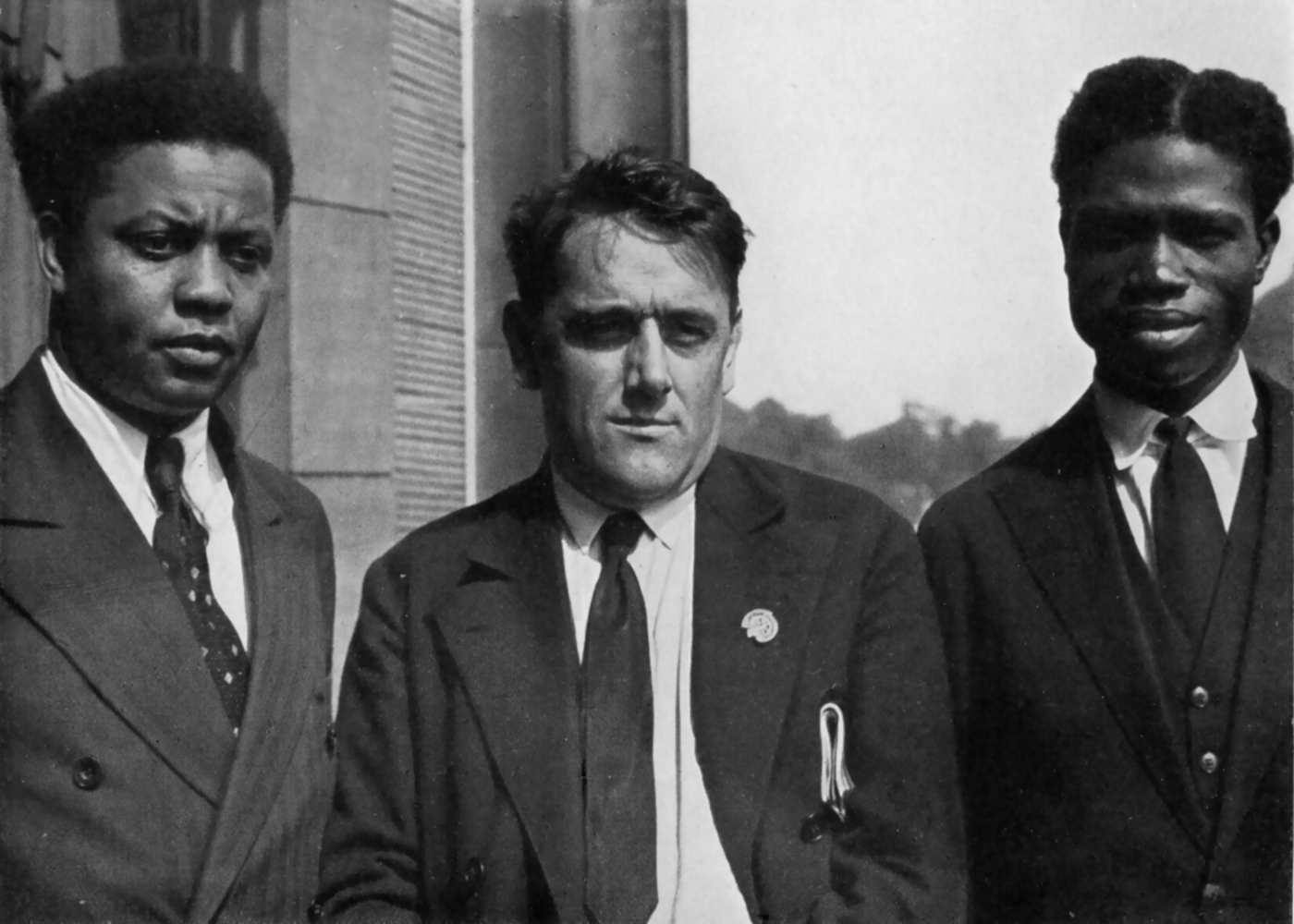
Münzenberg (center) with James W. Ford (left) and Tiemoko Garan Kouyaté at the Second League Against Imperialism Congress, 1929

Until 1936, Münzenberg remained loyal to Joseph Stalin and to the aims of Soviet foreign policy. In the autumn of 1936 he travelled to the Soviet Union at the behest of the Comintern's executive, in order to discuss taking up the role of the Comintern's head of agitprop with Dmitry Manuilsky. The visit occurred shortly after the first of the Moscow Trials, and shook his faith in Stalinism: on the same trip he was reprimanded by the Comintern's International Control Commission (ICC) for laxness in security and his political independence. He persuaded Manuilsky to allow him to return to Paris in order to complete the solidarity work he had begun in aid of the Spanish Republicans before starting the position with the Comintern: however, he ran into further problems when attempting to leave the country, and was only given his passport and an exit visa after the intervention of Palmiro Togliatti. According to Louis Fischer, a friend of Münzenberg's, he was afraid of possible reprisals if he returned to the USSR and was disturbed by the victimisation of figures such as Nikolai Bukharin.

In late 1936, fellow KPD exile Walter Ulbricht urged him to take up an offer from Dimitrov, then residing in Moscow, to return there and assume other missions on behalf of the Comintern. Münzenberg refused, as a result becoming persona non grata in the Communist movement. In early 1937 he was forced to yield control of the organisations he used for propaganda work to Bohumír Šmeral. The Communist Party press reported his expulsion from the party in April 1939 after the Comintern ICC had held hearings earlier in the year.

Having been expelled from the German Communist Party (KPD), Münzenberg finally moved into open opposition to Stalin. A final article on the disgraced propagandist in the Comintern journal Die Internationale warned, "Unser fester Wille, die Einheit unter den Antifaschistischen herzustellen, unser Gefühl der Verantwortlichkeit vor dem deutschen Volk macht es uns daher zur Pflicht, vor Münzenberg zu warnen. Er ist ein Feind!" ("Our unshaking determination to unify anti-Fascists, our sense of duty before the German people, obliges us to warn them about Münzenberg. He is an enemy!") Münzenberg was an outspoken critic of the Molotov–Ribbentrop Pact, accusing Stalin of being a "traitor" to the working class and the cause of peace.

Back in Paris, Münzenberg became a leader of German émigré antifascism. The most important publication of his post-Communist Party period was Die Zukunft, a weekly whose contributors included German literary émigrés such as Alfred Döblin, Arnold Zweig, Thomas and Heinrich Mann, Franz Werfel, Ernst Toller and Lion Feuchtwanger, as well as international writers including Ignazio Silone, Aldous Huxley, François Mauriac, George Peabody Gooch, H. G. Wells, Julien Benda and Kingsley Martin, and global political and social figures such as Léon Jouhaux, Pietro Nenni, Francesco Saverio Nitti, Carlo Sforza, Clement Attlee, Georges Bidault, Jawaharlal Nehru, Norman Angell and Harold Macmillan. Die Zukunft continued to be published until the Battle of France in May 1940. It has been cited as the intellectual forerunner of Encounter and other Cold War publications. Münzenberg continued to work on behalf of antifascist causes throughout Western Europe, where he played a role in recruiting volunteers and acquiring Soviet arms for the International Brigades which fought for the Republican side in the Spanish Civil War. He also established a committee to provide aid to the Republican refugees who were held at Gurs internment camp at the end of the Civil War.

== Death ==
In June 1940, Münzenberg fled from Paris, where he had been making anti-Nazi broadcasts, to escape the advance of German forces. While in the south of France, he was imprisoned by the Daladier government at Camp militaire de Chambaran, an internment camp located in the Forêt des Chambaran (Chambaran Forest, in the Plateau de Chambaran) near the commune of Roybon, in southeastern France. There, another camp inmate, unknown to Münzenberg and his colleagues, befriended Münzenberg and proposed that the two of them escape in the chaos of the Armistice. Some sources believe the unknown Communist was actually an agent of Lavrentiy Beria's NKVD. Münzenberg agreed, and he, the stranger, and several of Münzenberg's colleagues (including Valentin Hartig, a former SPD official, and Hans Siemsen, Münzenberg's Brown Books collaborator) fled southward, in the direction of the Swiss border. Münzenberg disappeared a few days later; on 21 June he left his travelling companions to look for a car which would take him to the Gurs internment camp, where his partner was being held. It was the last anyone saw of him alive.

On October 17, 1940, in the Bois de Caugnet between Saint-Antoine-l'Abbaye and Montagne, near Saint Marcellin, French hunters discovered Münzenberg's partially decomposed corpse at the foot of an oak tree. The initial newspaper report stated that the cause of death was strangulation caused by a "knotted cord" but other sources state that the cause of death was a garrote (a weapon usually formed from a knotted rope or cord). The body was found resting upright on the knees, with a knotted cord draped over the skull. The knotted cord had apparently snapped soon after the body had been suspended from an overhead branch. The police investigation of the circumstances of his death, including the brief coroner's report, did not interrogate Münzenberg's fellow camp inmates, and cause of death was listed officially as suicide. However, several eyewitnesses at the prison camp, including Valentin Hartig and Hans Siemsen, reported that Münzenberg remained in high spirits both during his days at Chambaran and in the first days of his flight to freedom after which they lost sight of their comrade.

Another theory is that Münzenberg was killed by German agents working for the Gestapo, who had apparently infiltrated his organization in 1939. One of the most notable documents in the Bundesbeauftragte für die Stasi-Unterlagen (Federal Commission For Stasi Documents) archive is a letter referring to information obtained from the prewar Deutsches Institut für Militärgeschichte files in Potsdam. On 10 June 1969, the head of Hauptabteilung I, Generalmajor Kleinjung (Karl Kleinjung), wrote to Erich Mielke, then Minister of State Security, The letter stated that there was proof that a secret agent of the Gestapo with the code name V 49 had infiltrated Münzenberg's group in 1939. The identity of the agent remains unknown. The widely circulated theory that he was executed by the NKVD was also countered by the theory of Wilhelm Leo's son, Gerhard, in his reminiscences of the French Resistance: that Wilhelm Leo escaped the Chambaran Internment Camp with Münzenberg and confirmed that he committed suicide, as confirmed by French investigators.

Arthur Koestler wrote in 1949 about the death of Willi Münzenberg: He "was murdered in the summer of 1940 under the usual lurid and mysterious circumstances; as usual in such cases, the murderers are unknown and there are only indirect clues, all pointing in one direction like magnetic needles to the pole."
