= Fritz Tobias =

German writer and politician

Fritz Tobias (3 October 1912 – 1 January 2011) was a German writer, government official and member of the Social Democratic Party of Germany. He was Ministerialrat in the Lower Saxony Ministry of the Interior and was then in the State Office for the Protection of the Constitution of Lower Saxony.

In the 1960s, he became known by his statements to the Reichstag fire. An "amateur historian", Tobias had taken the trouble to explore the history of the events in Berlin on 27 February 1933. According to his findings the Nazis were not guilty and the historically-significant arson would have been the action of Marinus van der Lubbe alone. Most historians agree that Tobias was correct.

== Early life and career ==
Tobias grew up in Berlin as the son of a Social Democratic porcelain painter. In 1926, Tobias moved to Hanover. In April 1940, Tobias was drafted for military service. He took part in the Second World War until 1945, and he claimed to have suffered several injuries, most recently in April 1945 in northern Italy. After the war Tobias was being accused of having belonged to the Geheime Feldpolizei during the war, which he dismissed as "fictitious".

In 1946, Tobias entered the civil service. In the early postwar years, he was involved in, among other things, the denazification of Lower Saxony.

In 1951, Tobias was accepted as a spokesman for the Lower Saxony Ministry of the Interior. After working in various departments, he became in 1959 involved in the temporary constitutional protection of Lower Saxony. In the administrative service, he was eventually promoted to ministerial council.

According to the journalist and former editor of Spiegel Peter-Ferdinand Koch, the British Secret Intelligence Service had already recommended Tobias to the Lower Saxony Ministry of the Interior at the end of 1945, as he had interrogated high-ranking SS officers on behalf of the British military police and war crimes investigators.

== Reichstag Fire research ==
Tobias became publicly known as the author of the eleven-part series "Get up, van der Lubbe!" It appeared in Der Spiegel in 1959 to 1960.

In those articles and in his 1962 book on the Reichstag fire, Tobias advocated the controversial thesis that Marinus van der Lubbe was the sole perpetrator of the Reichstag fire on 27 February 1933, which led to the issuance of the Reichstag Fire Decree.

The series of articles published in Der Spiegel later turned into the book Der Reichstagsbrand. Legende und Wirklichkeit (1962), which was translated into English as "The Reichstag Fire: Legend and Truth" (1964). After making an extensive study of The Brown Book of the Reichstag Fire and Hitler Terror, he argued that it was based on forged documents, like the Oberfohren Memorandum. Arthur Koestler, who had been part of the team working on the book, admitted that it had been based on several forged documents.

== Archive ==
After the death of Tobias, Polit-Kriminalfall Reichstags-Brand. Legende und Wirklichkeit was published in 2011, with co-author Fred Duswald. Tobias's private archive was first managed by his partner. After she died in 2013, Tobias's son agreed, as was publicised in July 2013, to submit the archive to the German authorities.

From 2015 to autumn 2017, the Federal Archives ordered and systematized the estate of Tobias. After sorting out a chronological collection of 723 file units was formed from around 3,000 folders, which have been on the Federal Archives since 2018 as historical collection.
