= Young Communist International =

International youth organization affiliated with the Communist International

- Logo of the Young Communist International (Russian version badge)
- Abbreviation: YCI
- Predecessor: International Union of Socialist Youth
- Successor: World Federation of Democratic Youth
- Formation: 20 November 1919
- Founded at: Berlin
- Dissolved: May 15, 1943; 83 years ago
- Headquarters: Berlin, Germany; Moscow, Soviet Union
- Secretary General: Willi Münzenberg; Voja Vujović
- Parent organization: Communist International

The Young Communist International (YCI) was the parallel international youth organization affiliated with the Communist International (Comintern).

== History ==
=== International socialist youth organization before World War I ===
After failed efforts to form an international association of socialist youth organizations in 1889 and 1904, in May 1907 a conference in Stuttgart, Germany convened to form the International Union of Socialist Youth Organisations (the Internationale Verbindung Sozialistischer Jugendorganisationen, abbreviated IVSJO). IVSJO maintained its headquarters in Vienna and functioned as the youth section of the Second International.

At its foundation the International Secretary of IVSJO was Hendrik de Man. De Man was succeeded by Robert Danneberg, who held the post from 1908 to 1915. The first Chairman of the IVSJO was the German anti-militarist radical Karl Liebknecht. Liebknecht served as an inspiration and "elder statesman" for radical youth throughout Europe.

The coming of the First World War brought an end to the work of the IVSJO. The organization was founded on the premise that its task was primarily educational, rather than political, and that participation of the young socialists of all countries and all political tendencies was necessary for its continued ability to function. The coming of the European war and the support of the various national socialist parties for their governments in the conflict effectively ended the possibility of international cooperation and the official IVSJO effectively ceased to exist.

The radical youth movement based in the neutral nation of Switzerland attempted to unite the various national sections of the socialist movement on a new basis, however. With the charismatic head of the Swiss socialist youth movement, Willi Münzenberg, playing the leading part, an anti-militaristic conference of international youth sections was called. On April 4, 1915, nine delegates from various neutral countries assembled in Bern to attempt to establish a center for a revitalized IVSJO organization. While the conference did not endorse Lenin's call for revolutionary civil war to end the European bloodbath, the conference did endorse "revolutionary socialism" and the recreation of the socialist youth movement independent of the various (chauvinistic) national socialist parties. As historian Richard Cornell notes, "This marked a critical turning point in the history of the socialist youth movement."

The Bern conference decided to start a publication called Die Jugendinternationale (German: The Youth International) and an International Youth Bureau was established. Headquarters were established in Zurich, with Willi Münzenberg elected by the conference to fill the role of International Secretary of the reconstituted IVSJO.

=== Formation of the YCI ===
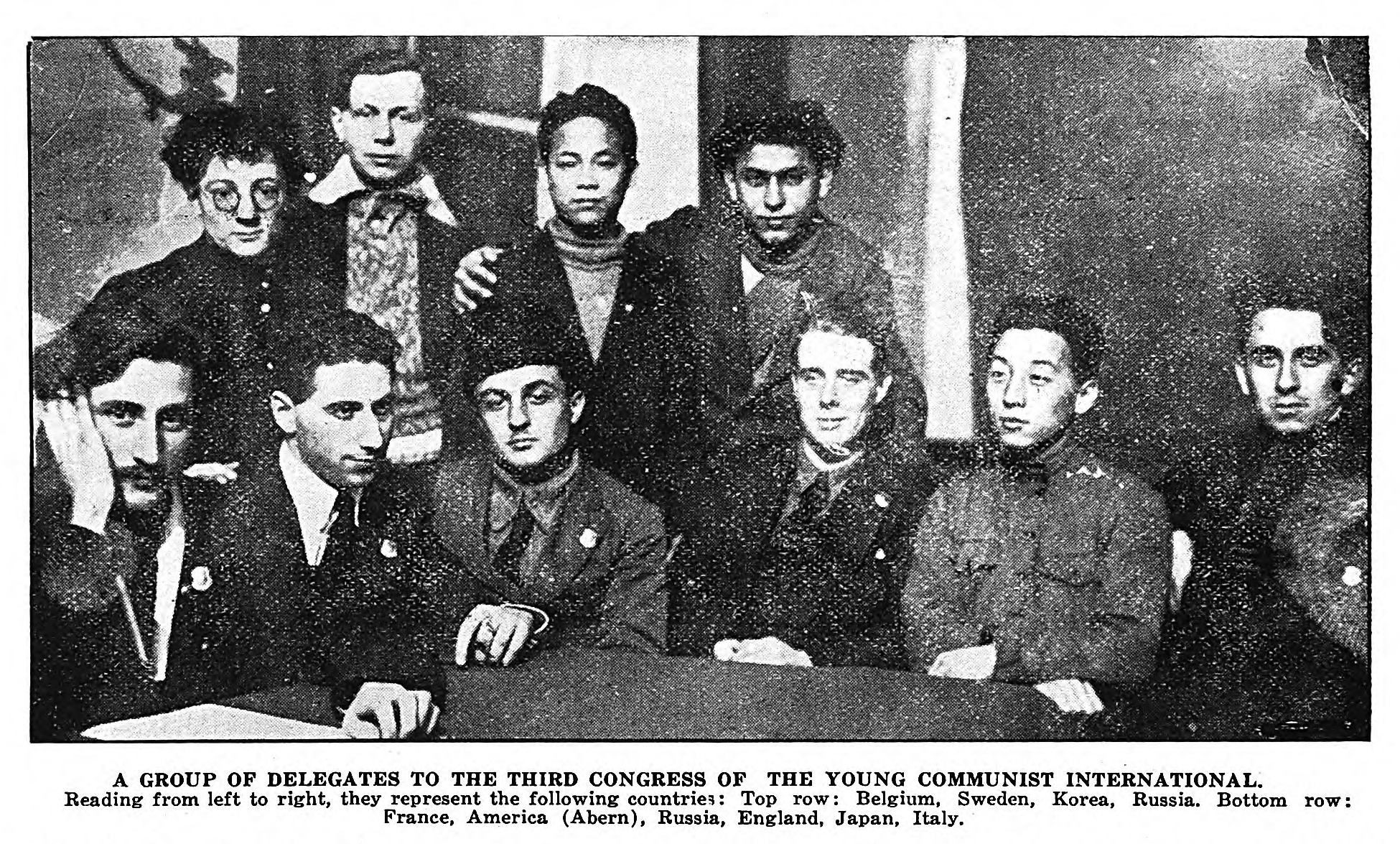
Delegates to the Third Congress of the Young Communist International, 1923

By 1918, all the official socialist youth organizations of Europe — with the exception of the German, the Dutch, and the French — had affiliated themselves with the reconstituted IVSJO. While the organization was anti-militarist, severe divisions remained as to how to bring an end to the war. The pacifist Center faction sought the establishment of binding arbitration and measures for the active limitation of armaments, while the revolutionary Left, inspired by events in Soviet Russia, increasingly came to see international revolution as the only possible solution to the inevitability of capitalist war. This division roughly paralleled the split in the adult movement of the Zimmerwald movement between pacifist Majority and revolutionary Left factions.

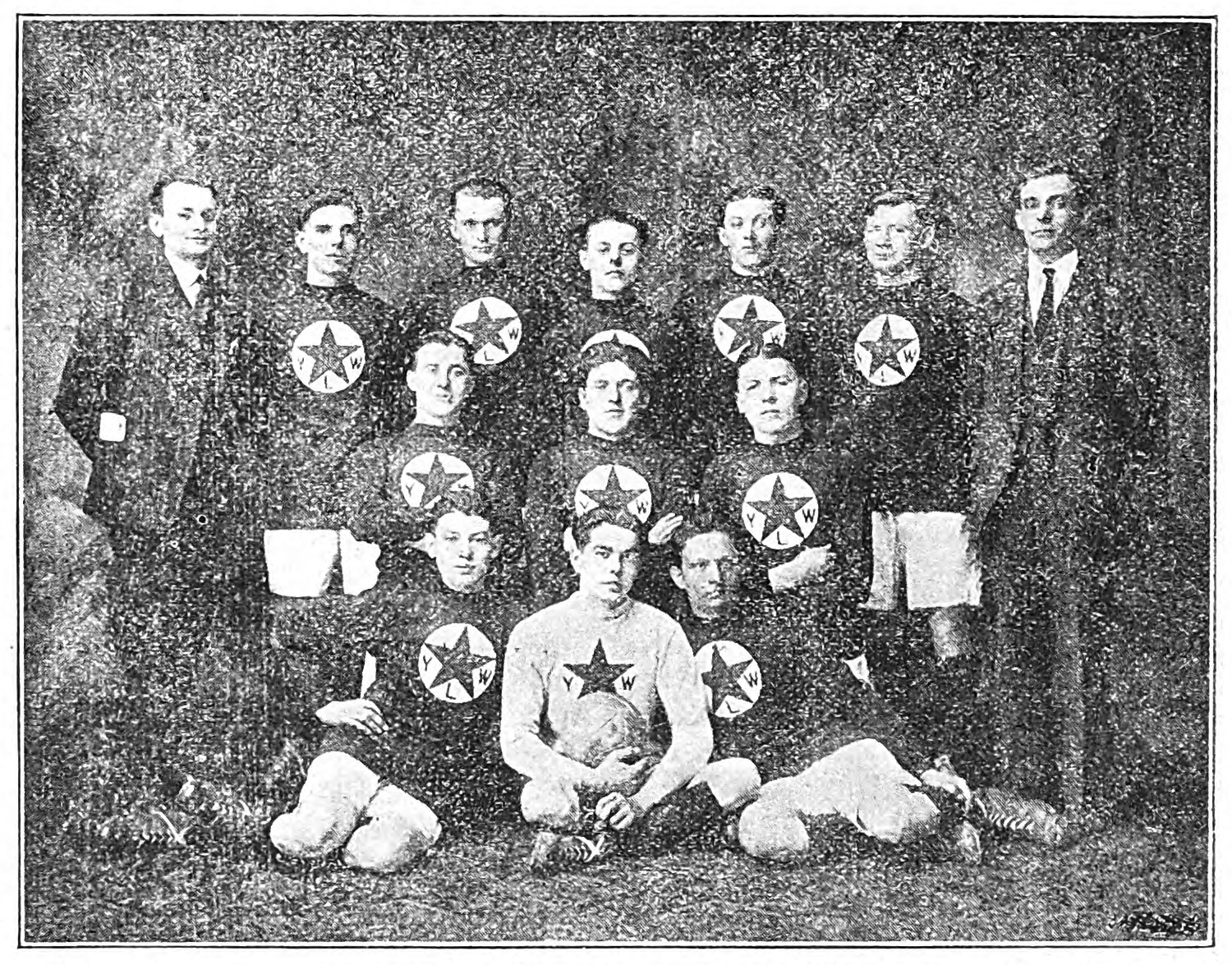
The Karl Liebknecht branch of the YWL Chicago soccer team c. 1923

The decisive break came in March 1919 with the establishment of the Communist International in Moscow. Splits began to take place in socialist parties around the world between electorally-oriented socialist and revolutionary-oriented communist tendencies. As Richard Cornell notes, "The young socialists were now pitched headlong into party debates. Neutrality was no longer possible."

On November 20, 1919, the IVSJO held its first conference after the war. In secret conditions in a beer-hall in Berlin delegates representing many of the socialist youth organizations of Europe assembled, called together by International Secretary Willi Münzenberg. The conference decided to change the name to "Young Communist International" and was subsequently known as the First Congress of YCI. Some 19 delegates were in attendance, representing the socialist youth organizations of Russia, Germany, Italy, Sweden, Norway, Denmark, Switzerland, Austria, Poland, Hungary, Romania, and Spain, as well as an opposition faction from Czechoslovakia.

The First Congress established headquarters for the YCI organization in Berlin. Decisions of the organization were to be made by a five-member Executive Committee of the Communist Youth International (ECCYI), and a program for the organization was adopted.

=== The Question of Party Control ===
Perhaps the most important issue determined during the first years of the Young Communist International dealt with the relationship of the youth movement with the emerging communist parties of various countries. This matter had been tenaciously discussed at the 1919 Berlin Conference, with the Russian delegate, Lazar Shatskin, advancing the position that the various national youth groups should be under the immediate direction and control of the corresponding adult parties. This position was opposed by others from the Western European socialist tradition, which envisioned an independent vanguard role for the communist youth movement. At Berlin a compromise was reached, in which it was agreed that the YCI would not be considered a "sister" organization to the Communist International, but rather a "part" of the Comintern. National youth organizations were obligated to follow either the political program of "that party or faction in their country which is a member of the Third International" or the program of the Comintern itself.

The YCI remained divided between adherents of an independent line, concentrated in Germany and headed by Willi Münzenberg, and those desiring to follow a close Russian lead through the close direction of the youth movement by the Comintern.

Historian of the early Communist youth movement Richard Cornell notes the thinking of the Berlin-centric group:

Münzenberg at this time gave expression to what was clearly the underlying sense of frustration of the young communist activists. Acknowledging the necessity for centralism in the Communist movement so as to concentrate "the greatest striking power," he pleaded almost despairingly not to so overcentalize the movement that the "revolutionary initiative" of all true communists was bound and stifled. Having struggled for so long toget out from under the bureaucracy of the German social democrats (SPD), Münzenberg and the young German communists had no desire to substitute a new communist bureaucracy for the old social democratic one.

The division between independent and Moscow-centric young communists came to a head in 1921 over the scheduling of a 2nd World Congress of the Young Communist International. The Russo-centric contingent of the YCI had sought a gathering in Moscow in the summer of 1921, in conjunction with the previously scheduled 3rd World Congress of the Communist International. Head of the Comintern Grigory Zinoviev had been prevailed upon to send a letter to the ECCYI in November 1920 supporting such a venue. Nevertheless—and over the strong objections of its Russian contingent—the Executive Committee of the YCI independently decided to convene the 2nd World Congress of the organization's deliberative body on April 6 in Jena. The Russians refused to attend this gathering, which had to be held in secrecy due to its "illegal" status in the eyes of the police. Four days after its convocation, the meeting place of the secret gathering was shifted to Berlin, due to security considerations. The session was abruptly terminated at the Comintern's behest on instructions from the Executive Committee of the Communist International.

A so-called "Real Second Congress" was convened in Moscow between June 9 and June 23, immediately prior to the 3rd World Congress of the Comintern. Historian E.H. Carr remarked:

"That resistance and criticism was experienced is suggested by the fact that Lenin intervened in person in order to reconcile divergent opinions, and that Trotsky appeared at the congress to defend Comintern against the charge of subordinating the interests of world revolution to those of Soviet Russia. But difficulties were overcome, compliance registered, and the headquarters of the Communist Youth International transferred to Moscow. Subsequent congresses of the Communist Youth International were held in Moscow simultaneously with the congresses of the Comintern. Once more, a step had been taken which favoured the centralized discipline of Comintern at the expense of that degree of independence which was necessary for the encouragement of mass movements. It may have been a coincidence that Münzenberg was transferred after the congress to other work."

For its part, the 3rd Congress of Comintern addressed the question of the communist youth movement. The YCI organization was streamlined along the structure of the Comintern and YCI member organization were obliged to adopt the name "Young Communist League" followed by their national denomination.

YCI symbol, French-Portuguese-Spanish version

Following the 2nd World Congress of the YCI, Münzenberg was succeeded by Voja Vujović as head of the organization.

=== Dissolution of the YCI ===
In 1943 the YCI was dissolved along with the Comintern. Its successor organization is the World Federation of Democratic Youth.

== National sections of the YCI ==
- Canada - Young Communist League of Canada
- Chile - Communist Youth of Chile
- China - Communist Youth League of China
- Cuba - Young Communist League
- Czechoslovakia - Young Communist League of Czechoslovakia (1921–1936)
- Estonia - Young Communist League of Estonia
- Finland - Young Communist League of Finland
- Germany - Young Communist League of Germany
- Iceland - Young Communist League of Iceland
- Norway - Young Communist League of Norway
- Persia - Young Communist League of Persia
- Poland - Young Communist League of Poland
- Romania - Union of Communist Youth
- Soviet Union - Communist Union of Youth (Komsomol)
- Sweden - Young Communist League of Sweden
- Britain - Young Communist League of Great Britain
- U.S. - Young Communist League, USA
- Western Ukraine - Young Communist League of Western Ukraine
- Yugoslavia - Young Communist League of Yugoslavia
