= Marinus van der Lubbe =

Dutch communist and alleged arsonist (1909–1934)

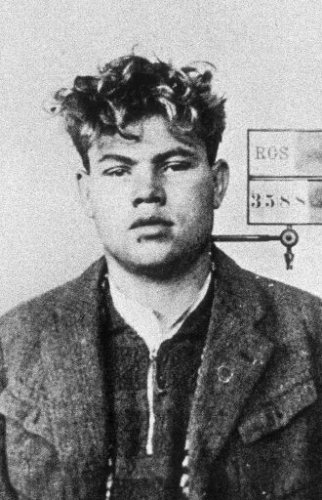
- Van der Lubbe in 1933
- Born: 13 January 1909; Leiden, Netherlands
- Died: 10 January 1934 (aged 24); Leipzig, Nazi Germany
- Resting place: Südfriedhof
- Occupations: Political activist and trade unionist
- Known for: Allegedly setting the Reichstag fire
- Political party: Communist Party of the Netherlands (1925–1931)
- Movement: Council communism
- Criminal charges: High treason and arson crime
- Criminal penalty: Death
- Criminal status: Executed by guillotine; Pardoned in 2008 (posthumously)

Marinus van der Lubbe (Dutch pronunciation: [maːˈrinʏs fɑn dər ˈlʏbə]; 13 January 1909 – 10 January 1934) was a Dutch council communist who was tried, convicted, and executed by the government of Nazi Germany for allegedly setting fire to the Reichstag building – the national parliament of Germany – on 27 February 1933. During his trial, the prosecution argued that van der Lubbe had acted on behalf of a wider communist conspiracy, while left-wing anti-Nazis argued that the fire was a false flag attack arranged by the Nazis themselves.

In 2008, 74 years after the event, the German government granted van der Lubbe a posthumous pardon on the basis of a 1998 law that rules all criminal convictions in Nazi Germany "went against the basic ideas of justice." Sonja Heine, a spokesperson for the Federal Prosecution Office, elaborated that the pardon was "not a ruling on whether van der Lubbe was guilty or innocent." The general consensus of historians is that van der Lubbe was the arsonist, but they remain split on whether van der Lubbe acted alone or part of a larger conspiracy.

== Early life ==
Marinus van der Lubbe was born in Leiden in the province of South Holland in the Netherlands. His parents were divorced, and after his mother died when he was 12 years old, he went to live with his half-sister's family in the town of Oegstgeest. During part of his youth van der Lubbe worked as a bricklayer. He was nicknamed Dempsey after boxer Jack Dempsey because of his great strength. While working, van der Lubbe became acquainted with the labour movement; in 1925, at age 16, he joined the Communist Party of the Netherlands (CPN) and its youth section, Communistische Jeugd Holland.

In 1926, he was injured at work, getting lime in his eyes, which hospitalised him for a few months and almost blinded him. Since the injury forced him to quit his job, he was unemployed with a pension of 7.44 guilders, equivalent to €168 in 2024, a week. After some conflicts with his sister, van der Lubbe relocated to Leiden in 1927. There he learned to speak some German and founded the Lenin House, where he organised political meetings. While working for the Tielmann factory, a strike began. Van der Lubbe claimed to the management to be one of the ringleaders and offered to accept any punishment if no one else was punished, even though he was clearly too inexperienced to have been involved seriously. During the trial, he tried to claim sole responsibility and was purportedly hostile to the idea of not being punished.

Afterwards, van der Lubbe planned to emigrate to the USSR, but he lacked the funds to do so. He was active politically among unemployed workers until 1931, when he had a disagreement with the CPN and instead approached the Group of International Communists. Around this time, he also became interested in anarcho-syndicalism. In 1933, van der Lubbe fled to Germany to work for communism there. He had a criminal record for several attempted arsons.

== Reichstag fire ==
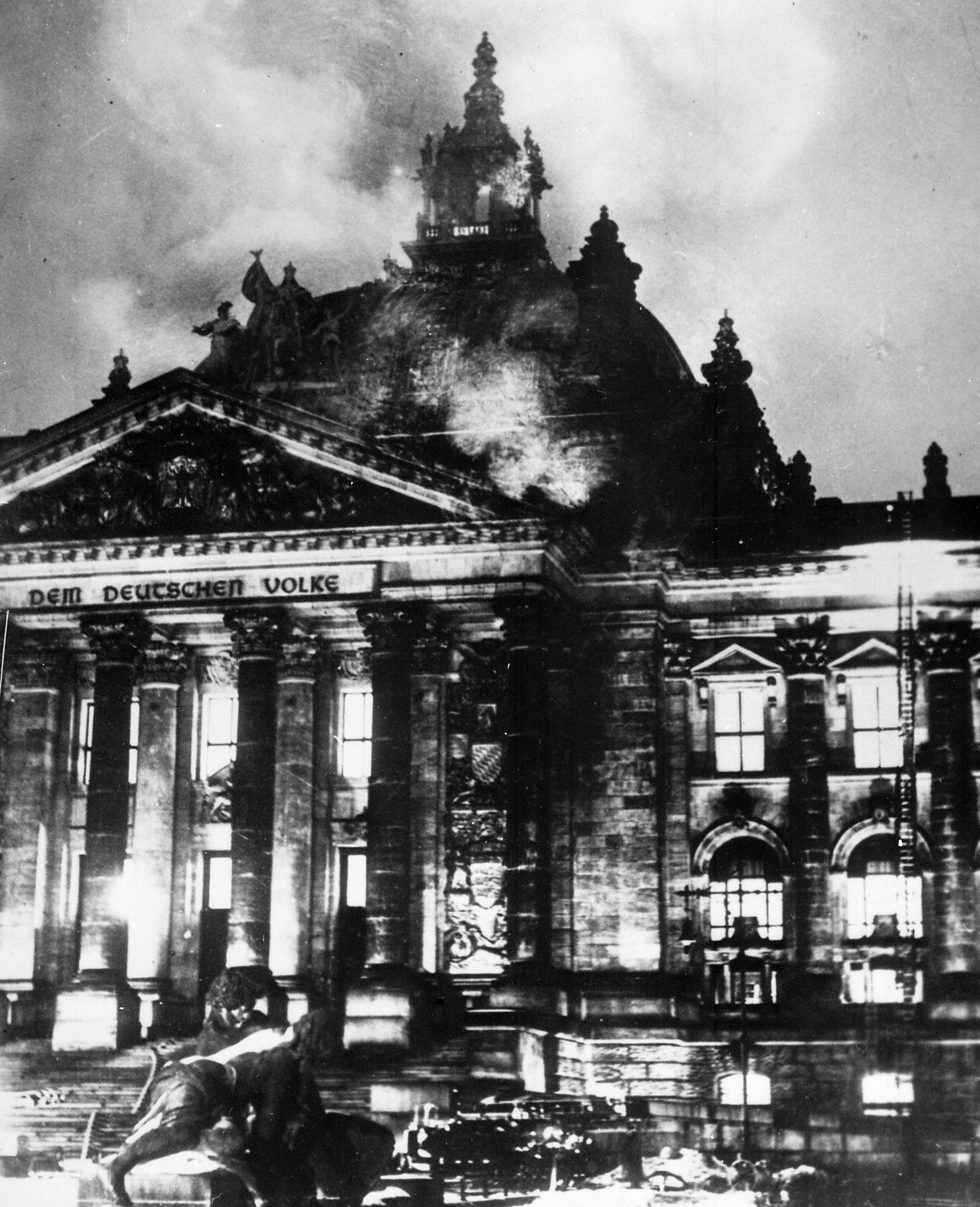
The Reichstag building afire

On 27 February 1933, van der Lubbe was arrested in the Reichstag building, soon after the building had begun burning. Van der Lubbe confessed and claimed to have acted alone and have set the Reichstag building afire in an attempt to rally German workers against fascist rule.

Van der Lubbe was tried along with the chief of the Communist Party of Germany and three members of the Bulgarian Communist Party, who were working in Germany for the Communist International. At his trial, van der Lubbe was convicted and sentenced to death for the Reichstag fire. The four other defendants (Ernst Torgler, Georgi Dimitrov, Blagoy Popov, and Vasil Tanev) were acquitted. Van der Lubbe was guillotined in a Leipzig prison yard on 10 January 1934, three days before his 25th birthday. He was buried in an unmarked grave in the Südfriedhof ('south cemetery') in Leipzig.

After World War II, attempts were made by his brother, Jan van der Lubbe, to have the original verdict reversed. In 1967, his sentence was changed by a judge from death to eight years in prison. In 1980, after more lengthy complaints, a West German court reversed the verdict entirely, but that was criticised by the state prosecutor. The case was re-examined by the Federal Court of Justice of Germany for three years. In 1983, the court made a final decision on the matter and reversed the result of the 1980 trial on grounds that there was no basis for it and so it was illegal. In January 2008, the public prosecutor general Monika Harms nullified the entire verdict and pardoned van der Lubbe posthumously.

=== Claimed responsibility and disputes ===
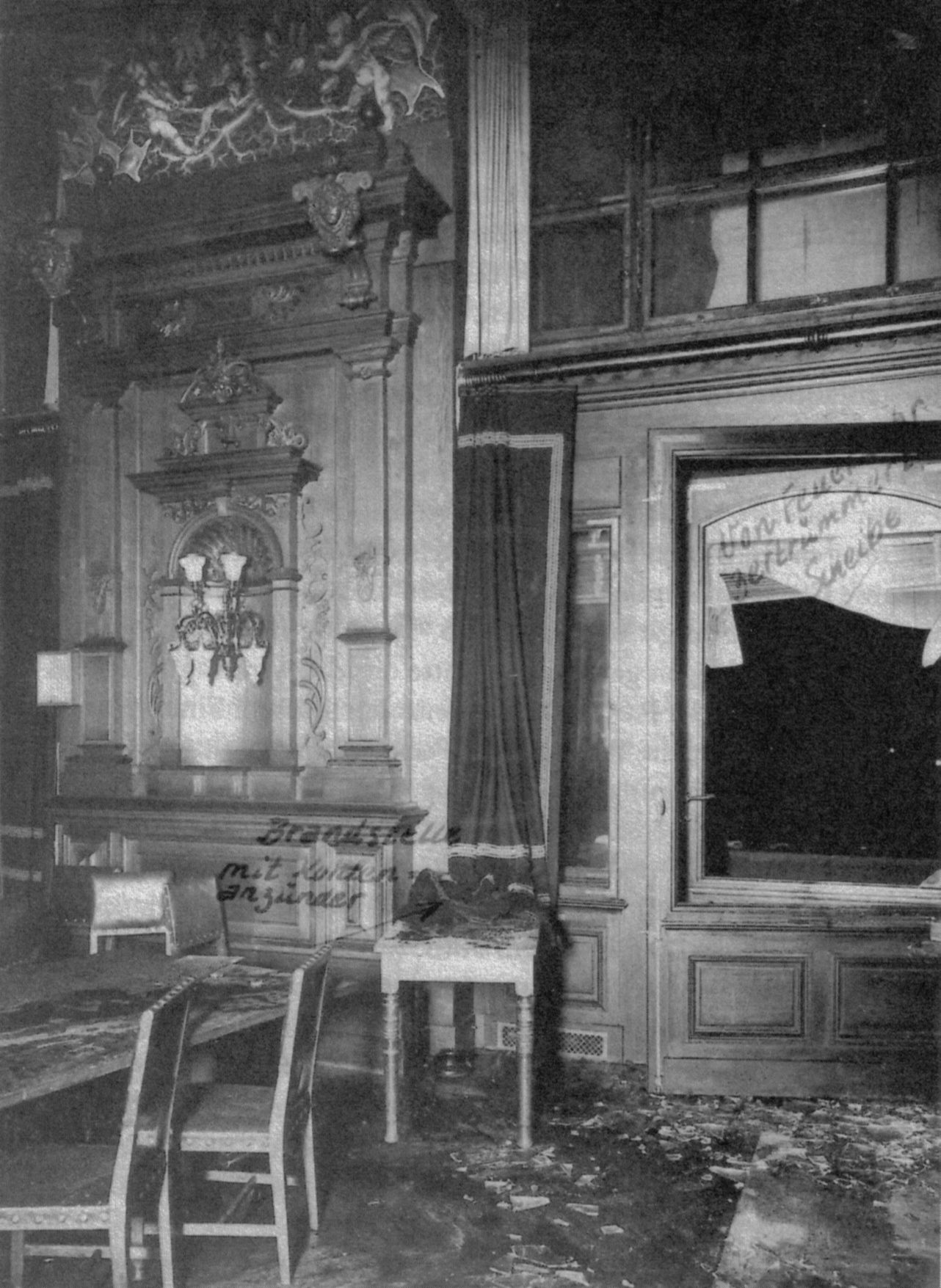
The window through which van der Lubbe allegedly entered the building

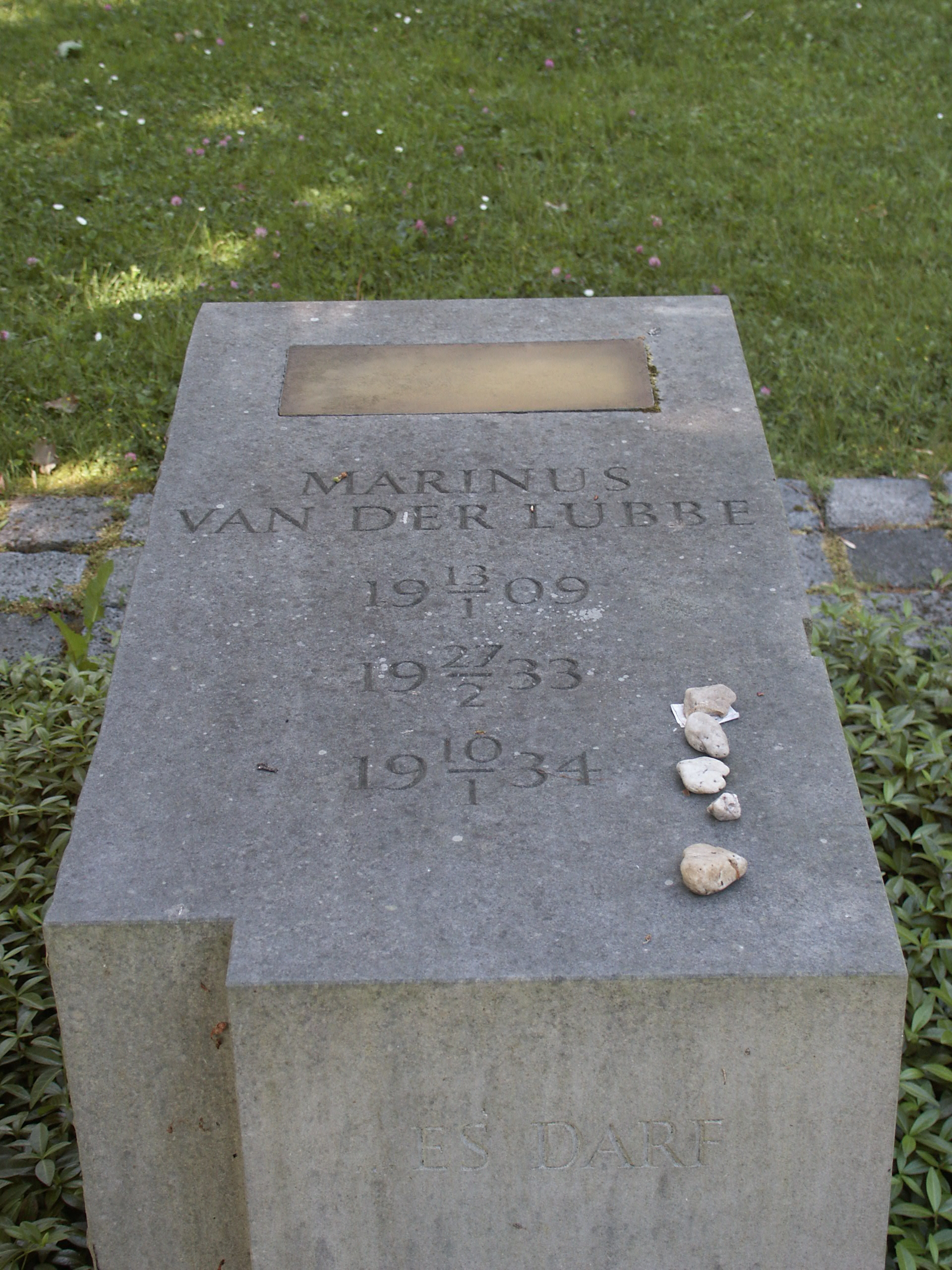
Memorial at the Südfriedhof in Leipzig. The stones placed are a Jewish custom to show remembrance and respect.

The Nazis blamed a communist conspiracy, while the Communists, conversely, charged a Nazi false flag conspiracy. Historians disagree as to whether van der Lubbe acted alone, as he said, to protest against the condition of the German working class, or was involved in a larger Nazi conspiracy. Responsibility for the Reichstag fire remains an ongoing topic of debate and research in modern historical scholarship. Journalist William Shirer, writing in 1960, surmised that van der Lubbe was goaded into setting a fire at the Reichstag but that the Nazis had set their own more elaborate fire at the same time. According to Ian Kershaw, writing in 1998, the consensus of nearly all contemporary historians is that van der Lubbe had in fact set the Reichstag afire.

== Lex van der Lubbe ==
Lex van der Lubbe is the colloquial term for the Nazi law concerning the imposition and execution of the death penalty, passed on 29 March 1933. The name comes from the fact that the law formed the legal basis for the imposition of the death penalty against van der Lubbe. The Reichstag Fire Decree of 28 February 1933 included a list of crimes for which the death penalty was to be imposed instead of a life sentence, as was previously the case. The law concerning the imposition and execution of the death penalty was passed by Hitler's government on 29 March (on the basis of the Enabling Act, which had been passed on 23 March 1933). It extended the law retroactively to 31 January 1933, thereby violating Article 116 of the Weimar Constitution, which prohibited retroactive penalties (ex post facto law). The Enabling Act itself made this legislation constitutional, provided the office of the president and the Reichstag and Reichsrat were not affected. It could thus be applied to van der Lubbe, who had admitted in court that he had set fire to the Reichstag on 27 February. The law was ultimately repealed by the Allied Control Council on 30 January 1946 through Control Council Act No. 11.

== Exhumation ==
In January 2023, bodily remains at van der Lubbe's presumed grave were exhumed. This was done to ascertain the precise location and identity of the grave, as well as to allow for a toxicological analysis. Van der Lubbe had appeared sleepy and apathetic during his trial, resulting in suspicions that he had been drugged. These remains were determined to be van der Lubbe's after several months of forensic investigations. The toxicology report showed no evidence that van der Lubbe had been administered drugs, although it was noted that due to decomposition it is impossible to scientifically prove one way or the other and that the question remains open.

== In popular culture ==
- Van der Lubbe is featured in the fifth season of the German television series Babylon Berlin.

== General references ==
- Bahar, Alexander; Kugel, Wilfried (2013). Der Reichstagsbrand Geschichte einer Provokation [The Reichstag fire: History of a Provocation] (in German). Köln: PapyRossa-Verl. ISBN 978-3-89438-495-1. OCLC 835307042.
- Fischler, Hersch (15 October 2005). "Zum Zeitablauf der Reichstagsbrandstiftung. Korrekturen der Untersuchung Alfred Berndts" [On the timeline of the Reichstag arson. Corrections to Alfred Berndt’s investigation]. Vierteljahrshefte für Zeitgeschichte. 53 (4): 617–632. doi:10.1524/vfzg.2005.53.4.617. ISSN 2196-7121. OCLC 7824744120.
- Schouten, Martin (2008). Marinus van der Lubbe: een biografie [Marinus van der Lubbe: a biography] (in Dutch). Amsterdam: De Bezige Bij. ISBN 978-90-234-2960-9. OCLC 227149687.
- Steven (22 September 2006). "Lubbe, Marinus van der 1911-1934". libcom.org. Archived from the original on 19 September 2021.
