= Young Communist League of Persia =

The Young Communist League of Persia (Persian: اتحادیه جوانان کمونیست ایران) was a communist youth organization in Iran. The organization was founded during the Gilan Revolution, following the July 31, 1920 split between the communist and non-communist Jangali factions. The YCL of Persia carried out agitation and propaganda activities, as well as armed actions against the followers of Kuchik Khan. The organization was dissolved following the defeat of the Gilan Soviet Socialist Republic.

In 1927, several communist youth groups merged to reconstitute the YCL of Persia as a section of the Young Communist International. The reconstituted organization was suppressed alongside other left-wing groups in the autumn of 1928.
