= Jugend-Internationale =

Monthly communist youth magazine in Switzerland (1919–1928)

- Editor: Willi Münzenberg
- Categories: Political magazine
- Frequency: Monthly
- Publisher: Secretariat of the International League of Socialist Youth Organisations
- Founder: International League of Socialist Youth Organisations
- Founded: 1915
- Final issue: 1928
- Country: Switzerland
- Based in: Zürich
- Language: German

Jugend-Internationale (German for Youth International) was a monthly communist youth magazine which was published in Switzerland between 1915 and 1928. It was the official media outlet of the International League of Socialist Youth Organisations.

== History and profile ==
Jugend-Internationale was launched in Zürich by the International League of Socialist Youth Organisations in 1915. Willi Münzenberg was named as its first editor. Its publisher was the secretariat of the organization. The magazine came out monthly, and its first eleven issues were published in Zürich until 1918. It supported the left-wing faction in the Swiss Social Democratic Party. Major contributors included many leading communists, including Vladimir Lenin, Leon Trotsky, Grigory Zinoviev, Karl Radek, Alexandra Kollontai, Karl Liebknecht, Otto Rühle, Eduard Bernstein, Friedrich Adler, and Robert Danneberg. György Lukács, a member of the Hungarian Communist Party, also published articles in Jugend-Internationale in 1921.

Eleven issues of Jugend-Internationale were also published in Russia, and four issues appeared in Denmark and Sweden. Its circulation was 160,000 copies in 1921. Jugend-Internationale folded in 1928.
