= Reichstag fire =

1933 arson attack in Berlin, Germany

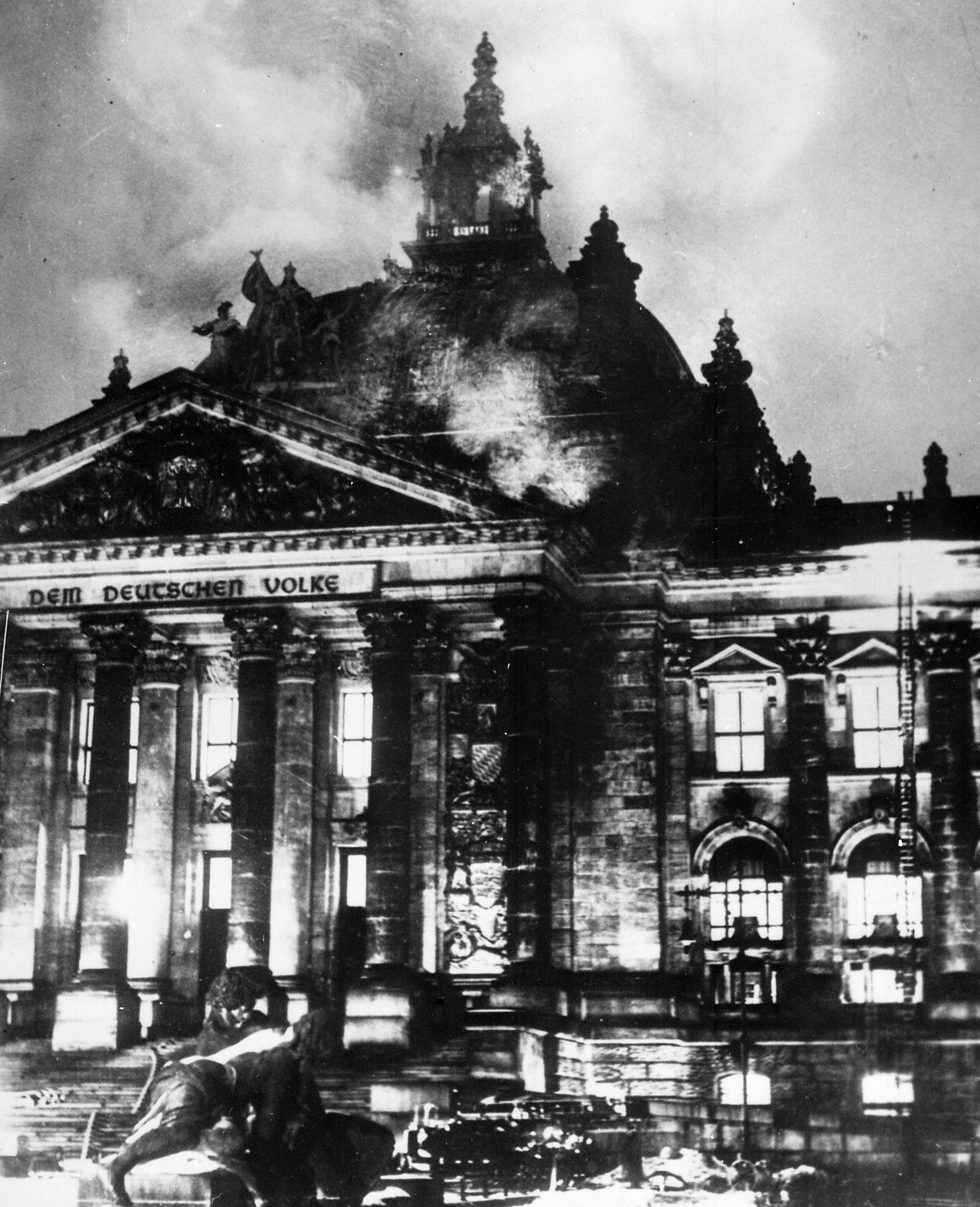
- Firefighters struggle to extinguish the fire
- Native name: Reichstagsbrand
- Date: 27 February 1933; 93 years ago
- Location: Reichstag building, Berlin, Germany; 52°31′7″N 13°22′34″E
- Type: Arson
- Participants: Marinus van der Lubbe (disputed)
- Outcome: Reichstag Fire Decree enacted; Van der Lubbe executed; Civil liberties suspended; Nazi control of government entrenched

The Reichstag fire (German: Reichstagsbrand, pronounced [ˈʁaɪçstaːksˌbʁant]) was an arson attack on the Reichstag building, home of the German parliament in Berlin, on Monday, 27 February 1933, precisely four weeks after Adolf Hitler was sworn in as Chancellor of Germany. Marinus van der Lubbe, a Dutch council communist, was said to be the culprit; the Nazis attributed the fire to a group of Communist agitators, used it as a pretext to claim that Communists were plotting against the German government, and induced President Paul von Hindenburg to issue the Reichstag Fire Decree, suspending civil liberties, and pursue a "ruthless confrontation" with the Communists. This made the fire pivotal in the establishment of Nazi rule in Germany.

The first report of the fire came shortly after 9:00 p.m., when a Berlin fire station received an alarm call. By the time police and firefighters arrived, the structure was engulfed in flames. The police conducted a thorough search inside the building and found Van der Lubbe, who was arrested.

After the Fire Decree was issued, the police – now controlled by Hitler's Nazi Party – made mass arrests of communists, including all of the communist Reichstag delegates. This severely crippled communist participation in the 5 March elections. After the 5 March elections, the absence of the communists allowed the Nazi Party to expand their plurality in the Reichstag, greatly assisting the Nazi seizure of total power. On 9 March 1933 the Prussian state police arrested Bulgarians Georgi Dimitrov, Vasil Tanev, and Blagoy Popov, who were known Comintern operatives (though the police did not know it then, Dimitrov was head of all Comintern operations in Western Europe). Ernst Torgler, chairman of the KPD Reichstag faction, had surrendered to police on 28 February.

Van der Lubbe and the four communists were the defendants in a trial that started in September 1933. It ended in the acquittal of the four communists and the conviction of Van der Lubbe, who was then executed. In 2008, Germany posthumously pardoned Van der Lubbe under a law introduced in 1998 to lift unjust verdicts from the Nazi era.

The responsibility for the Reichstag fire remains a topic of debate, as while Van der Lubbe was found guilty, it is unclear whether he acted alone. The consensus amongst historians is the Reichstag was set ablaze by Van der Lubbe; some consider it to have been a part of a Nazi plot, a view Richard J. Evans labels a conspiracy theory.

== Prelude ==
After the November 1932 German federal election, the Nazi Party had a plurality, not a majority; the communists posted gains. Adolf Hitler was sworn in as Chancellor and head of the coalition government on 30 January 1933. As chancellor, Hitler asked President Paul von Hindenburg to dissolve the Reichstag and call for a new parliamentary election. The date set for the elections was 5 March 1933.

Hitler hoped to abolish democracy in a quasi-legal fashion, by passing the Enabling Act. The Enabling Act was a special law that gave the Chancellor the power to pass laws by decree, without the involvement of the Reichstag. These special powers would remain in effect for four years, after which time they were eligible to be renewed. Under the Weimar Constitution, the President could rule by decree in times of emergency using Article 48.

During the election campaign, the Nazis alleged that Germany was on the verge of a communist revolution and that the only way to stop the communists was to put the Nazis securely in power. The message of the campaign was simple: increase the number of Nazi seats.

== The fire ==
Shortly after 9 p.m. on 27 February 1933, the Reichstag building was reported as on fire when a Berlin fire station received an alarm call, and firefighters were dispatched. Despite their efforts, most of the building was gutted. By 11:30 p.m., the fire was put out. The firefighters and police inspected the ruins and found 20 bundles of flammable material (firelighters) unburned lying about. At the time the fire was reported, Hitler was having dinner with Joseph Goebbels at Goebbels' apartment in Berlin. When Goebbels received an urgent phone call informing him of the fire, he regarded it as a "tall tale" at first and hung up. Only after the second call did he report the news to Hitler. Both left Goebbels' apartment and arrived by car at the Reichstag, just as the fire was being put out. They were met at the site by Hermann Göring, Interior Minister of Prussia, who told Hitler, "This is communist outrage! One of the communist culprits has been arrested." Hitler called the fire a "sign from God" and claimed it was a signal meant to mark the beginning of a communist revolt. The next day, Hitler reported that "this act of incendiarism is the most monstrous act of terrorism carried out by Bolshevism in Germany". The Vossische Zeitung newspaper warned its readers that "the government is of the opinion that the situation is such that a danger to the state and nation existed and still exists".

Walter Gempp was head of the Berlin fire department at the time of the Reichstag fire on 27 February 1933, personally directing the operations at the incident. On 25 March, he was dismissed for presenting evidence that suggested Nazi involvement in the fire. Gempp asserted that there had been a delay in notifying the fire brigade and that he had been forbidden from making full use of the resources at his disposal. In 1937, Gempp was arrested for abuse of office. Despite his appeal, he was imprisoned. Gempp was strangled and killed in prison on 2 May 1939.

== Political consequences ==
The day after the fire, at Hitler's request, President Hindenburg signed the Reichstag Fire Decree into law by using Article 48 of the Weimar Constitution. The Reichstag Fire Decree suspended most civil liberties in Germany, including habeas corpus, freedom of expression, freedom of the press, the right of free association and public assembly, and the secrecy of the post and telephone. These rights were not reinstated during Nazi reign. The decree was used by the Nazis to ban publications not considered friendly to the Nazi cause. Despite the fact that Marinus van der Lubbe claimed to have acted alone in the Reichstag fire, Hitler, after having obtained his emergency powers, announced that it was the start of a wider communist effort to take over Germany. Nazi Party newspapers then published this fabricated story. This sent the German population into a panic and isolated the communists further among the civilians; additionally, thousands of communists were imprisoned in the days following the fire (including leaders of the Communist Party of Germany) on the charge that the Party was preparing to stage a putsch. Speaking to Rudolph Diels about communists during the Reichstag fire, Hitler said "These sub-humans do not understand how the people stand at our side. In their mouse-holes, out of which they now want to come, of course they hear nothing of the cheering of the masses." With communist electoral participation also suppressed (the communists previously polled 17% of the vote), the Nazis were able to increase their share of the vote in the 5 March 1933 Reichstag elections from 33% to 44%. This gave the Nazis and their allies, the German National People's Party (who won 8% of the vote), a majority of 52% in the Reichstag.

While the Nazis emerged with a majority, they fell short of their goal, which was to win 50–55% of the vote that year. The Nazis thought that this would make it difficult to achieve their next goal, passage of the Enabling Act giving Hitler the right to rule by decree, which required a two-thirds majority. However, several important factors weighed in the Nazis' favour, mainly the continued suppression of the Communist Party and the Nazis' ability to capitalize on national security concerns. Moreover, some deputies of the Social Democratic Party (the only party that would vote against the Enabling Act) were prevented from taking their seats in the Reichstag, due to arrests and intimidation by the Nazi SA. As a result, the Social Democratic Party would be under-represented in the final vote tally. The Enabling Act passed easily on 23 March 1933, with the support of the right-wing German National People's Party, the Centre Party, and several fragmented middle-class parties. The measure went into force on 24 March, effectively making Hitler dictator of Germany.

The Kroll Opera House, sitting across the Königsplatz from the burned-out Reichstag building, functioned as the Reichstag's venue for the remaining 12 years of the Third Reich's existence.

== Legal proceedings ==
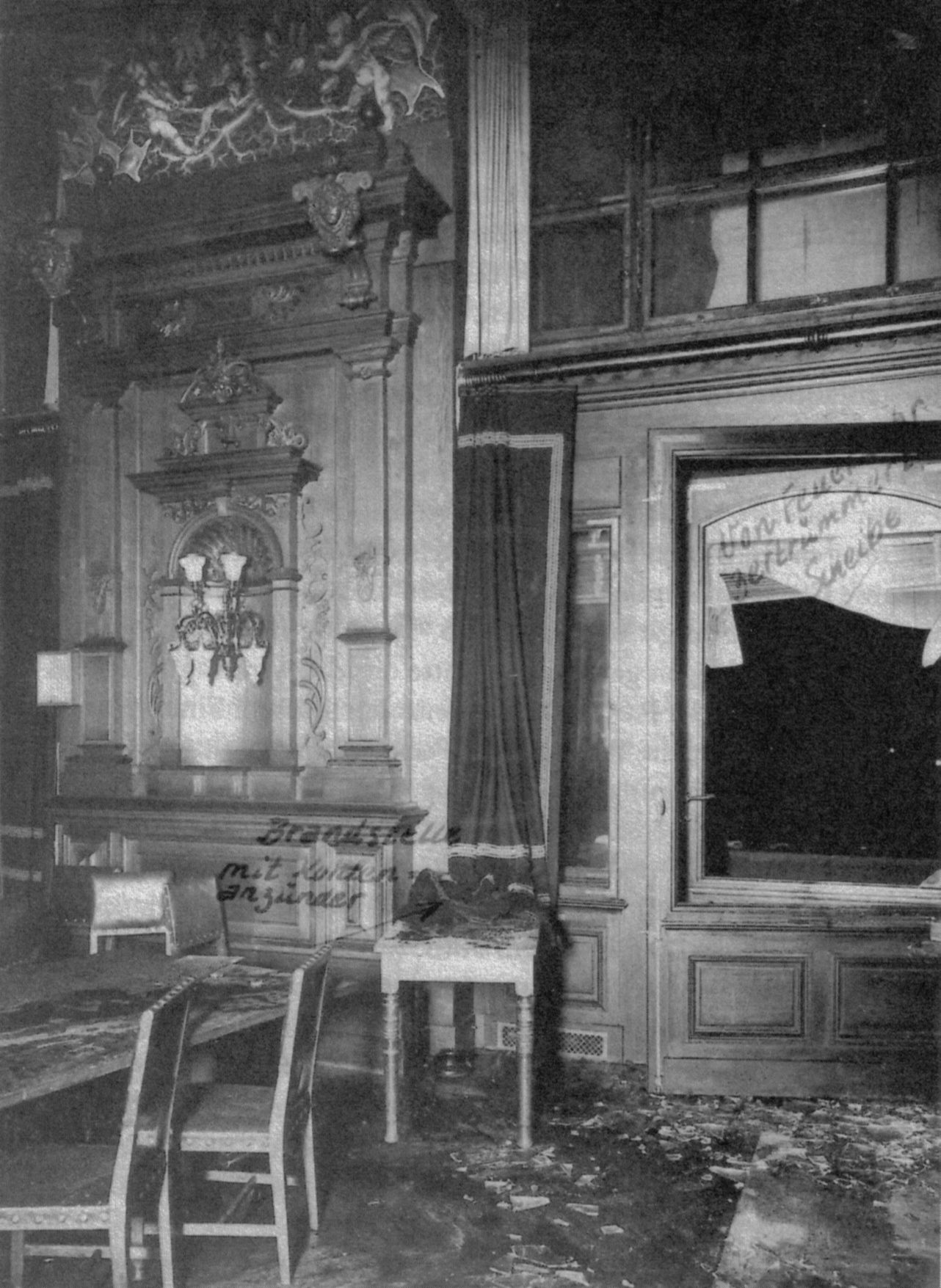
The window through which Marinus van der Lubbe supposedly entered the Reichstag building

In July 1933, Marinus van der Lubbe, Ernst Torgler, Georgi Dimitrov, Blagoy Popov, and Vasil Tanev were indicted on charges of setting the fire. The case against them was tried at the fourth criminal senate of the Reich Supreme Court in Leipzig from 21 September to 23 December in 1933.

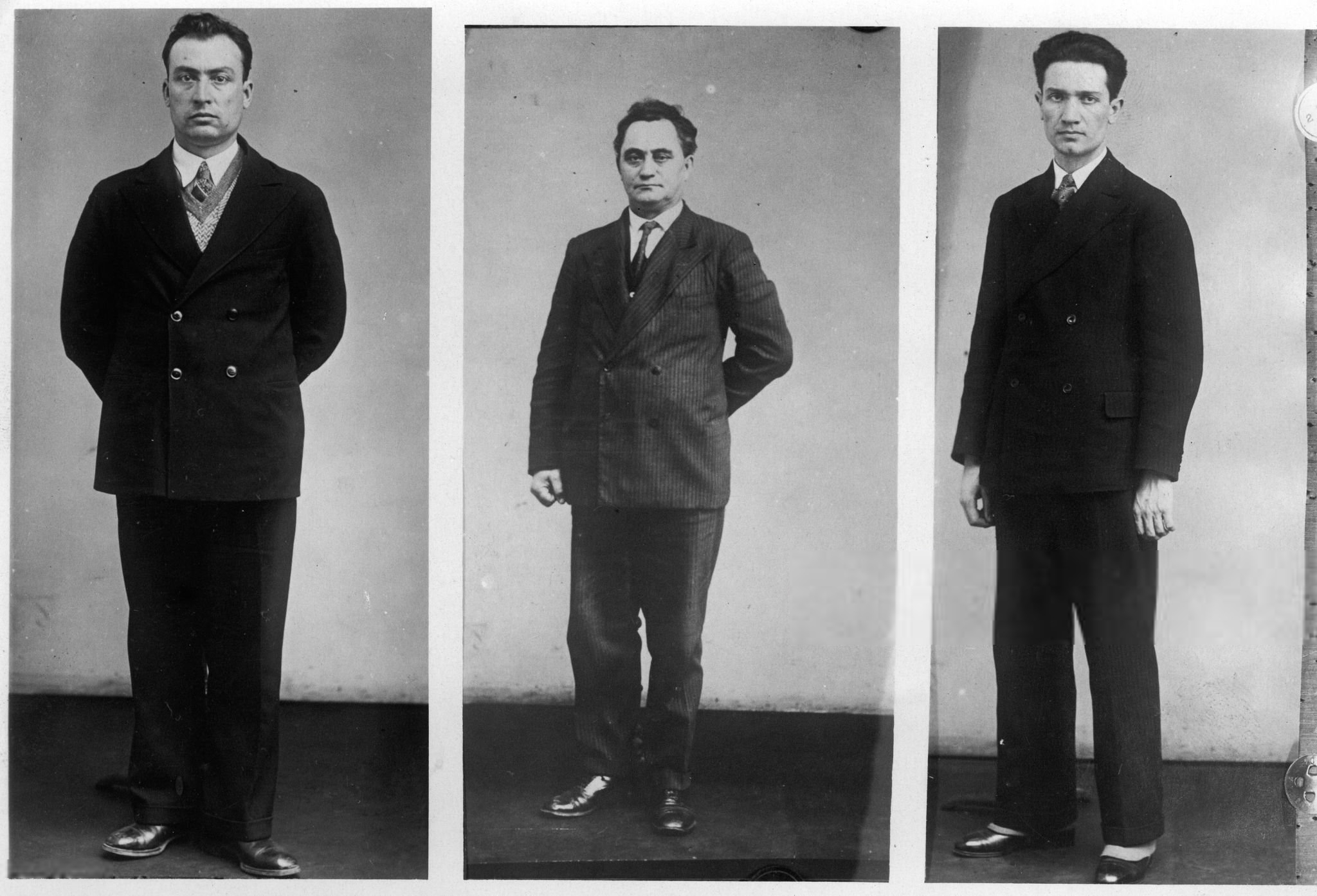
The Bulgarian communists shortly after their arrest, 1933 L-R: Vasil Tanev, Georgi Dimitrov, Blagoy Popov

The trial known as the Leipzig Trial took place and was presided over by judges from the German Supreme Court, the Reichsgericht. This was Germany's highest court. The presiding judge was Judge Wilhelm Bünger of the Fourth Criminal Court of the Fourth Penal Chamber of the Supreme Court. The prosecutors were Chief Reich Prosecutor Karl Werner and his assistant Felix Parrisius. The accused were charged with arson, and attempting to overthrow the government.

While the official start and end points of the trial were in Leipzig, the court proceedings were relocated to the scene of the crime itself. The move to Berlin facilitated efficient witness questioning and examination of evidence directly at the Reichstag building. For the last month (23 November – 23 December) the court returned to Leipzig.

=== The opening of the trial ===
The trial began at 8:45 on the morning of 21 September, with Van der Lubbe testifying. Van der Lubbe's testimony was very hard to follow as he spoke of losing his sight in one eye and wandering around Europe as a drifter and that he had been a member of the Communist Party of Holland, which he quit in 1931, but still considered himself a communist.

=== Media coverage ===
The Leipzig Trial was widely publicized, and broadcast on the radio. It was expected that the court would find the communists guilty on all counts.

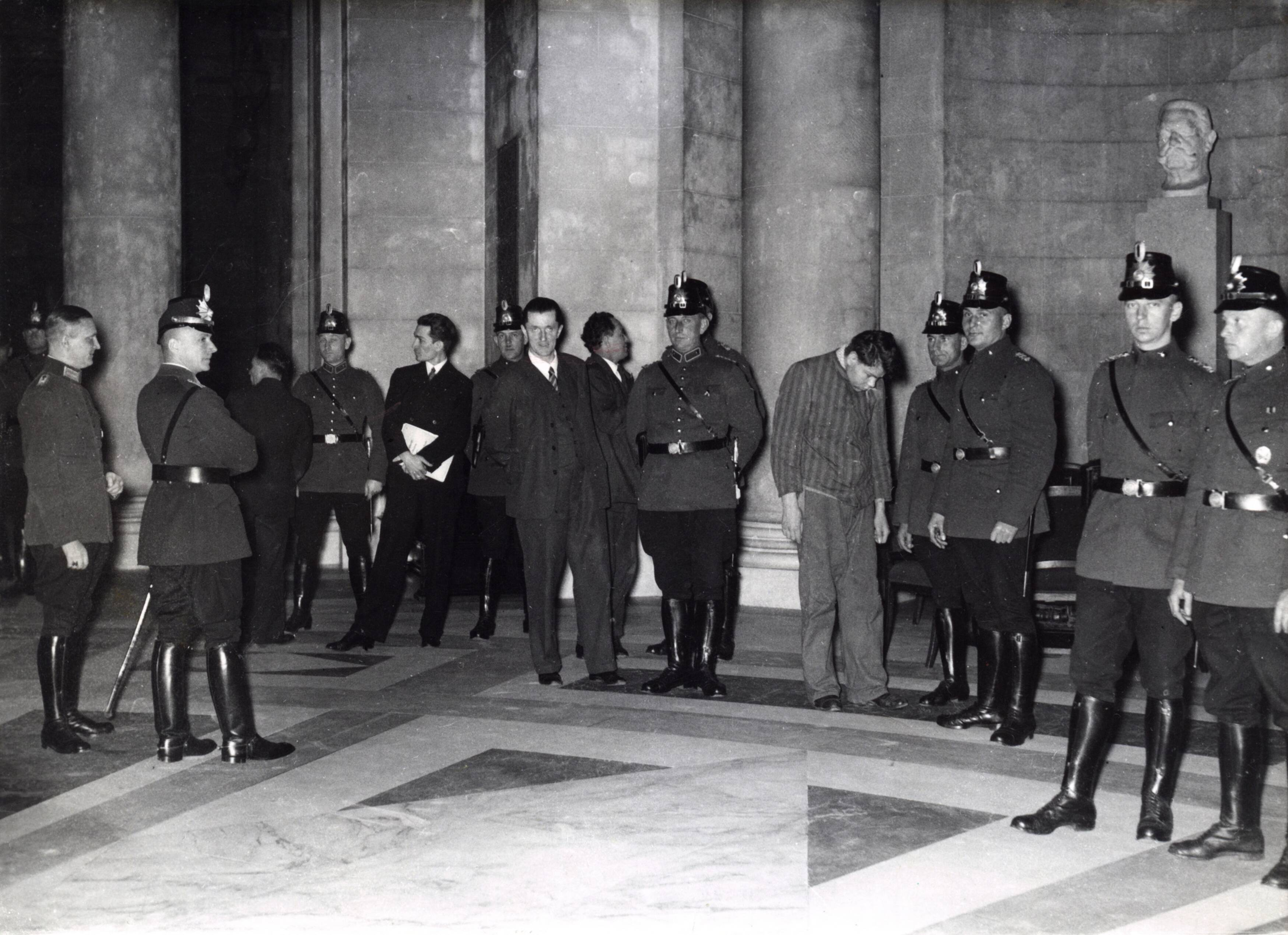
Marinus van der Lubbe during the trial in 1933 (with his head bowed down)

According to the German press, the Nazi government wanted to use the trial to get its own message out to the world. Goebbels's Propaganda Ministry had sent many of its officials to manage the flow of information to the foreign press. There were no fewer than eighty foreign correspondents in the courtroom, along with forty German colleagues, in the opening session of the court. The atmosphere of the opening of the trial was described by Otto D. Tolischus for The New York Times:

Repeatedly during the session glaring movie picture flares illuminated the somber court room. Microphones recorded the words of the participants in the drama and nearly half the large hall was filled with representatives of the world press. The rest of the hall was packed to the rafters with spectators, including representatives of foreign governments, foreign jurists of note and relatives of the accused.

=== Dimitrov's testimony ===
Georgi Dimitrov began his testimony on the third day of the trial. He gave up his right to a court-appointed lawyer and defended himself successfully. When warned by Judge Bünger to behave himself in court, Dimitrov stated: "Herr President, if you were a man as innocent as myself and you had passed seven months in prison, five of them in chains night and day, you would understand it if one perhaps becomes a little strained." During the course of his defence, Dimitrov claimed that the organizers of the fire were senior members of the Nazi Party and frequently verbally clashed with Göring at the trial. The high point of the trial occurred on 4 November 1933, when Göring took the stand and was cross-examined by Dimitrov. The following exchange took place:

Dimitrov: Herr Prime Minister Göring stated on February 28 that, when arrested, the "Dutch Communist Van der Lubbe had on his person his passport and a membership card of the Communist Party". From whom was this information taken?

Göring: The police search all common criminals, and report the result to me.

Dimitrov: The three officials who arrested and examined Van der Lubbe all agreed that no membership card of the Communist Party was found on him. I should like to know where the report that such a card had been found came from.

Göring: I was told by an official. Things which were reported to me on the night of the fire...could not be tested or proven. The report was made to me by a responsible official, and was accepted as a fact, and as it could not be tested immediately it was announced as a fact. When I issued the first report to the press on the morning after the fire the interrogation of Van der Lubbe had not been concluded. In any case I do not see that anyone has any right to complain because it seems proved in this trial that Van der Lubbe had no such card on him.

Dimitrov: I would like to ask the Minister of the Interior what steps he took to make sure that Van der Lubbe's route to Hennigsdorf, his stay and his meetings with other people there were investigated by the police to assist them in tracking down Van der Lubbe's accomplices?

Göring: As I am not an official myself, but a responsible Minister it was not important that I should trouble myself with such petty, minor matters. It was my task to expose the Party, and the mentality, which was responsible for the crime.

Dimitrov: Is the Reichsminister aware of the fact that those that possess this alleged criminal mentality today control the destiny of a sixth part of the world – the Soviet Union?

Göring: I don't care what happens in Russia! I know that the Russians pay with bills, and I should prefer to know that their bills are paid! I care about the Communist Party here in Germany and about Communist crooks who come here to set the Reichstag on fire!

Dimitrov: This criminal mentality rules the Soviet Union, the greatest and best country in the world. Is Herr Prime Minister aware of that?

Göring: I shall tell you what the German people already know. They know that you are behaving in a disgraceful manner! They know that you are a Communist crook who came to Germany to set the Reichstag on fire! In my eyes you are nothing, but a scoundrel, a crook who belongs on the gallows!

=== Verdict ===
In his verdict announced on 23 December, Judge Bünger was careful to underline his belief that there had in fact been a communist conspiracy to burn down the Reichstag, but declared, with the exception of Van der Lubbe, there was insufficient evidence to connect the accused to the fire or the alleged conspiracy. The Bulgarians were acquitted and were expelled to the Soviet Union. Only Van der Lubbe was found guilty and sentenced to death. Torgler was also acquitted and survived the war.

=== Other outcomes ===
The outcome of this trial caused Hitler to remove treason trials from the regular courts. He decreed that henceforth treason – among many other offenses – would only be tried by a newly established People's Court (Volksgerichtshof). The People's Court later became associated with the number of death sentences it handed down, including those following the 1944 attempt to assassinate Hitler, which were presided over by then Judge-President Roland Freisler.

=== Artistic response to the trial ===
One week before the trial began, on 14 September 1933, the German artist John Heartfield published a photomontage in the Arbeiter-Illustrierte-Zeitung, which he named "Goering, der Henker des Dritten Reiches" (Goering, the Executioner of the Third Reich). In it the burning Reichstag can be seen in the background.

=== Execution of Van der Lubbe, January 1934 ===
At his trial, Van der Lubbe was found guilty and sentenced to death. He was beheaded by guillotine (the customary form of execution in Saxony at the time) on 10 January 1934, three days before his 25th birthday. The Nazis alleged that Van der Lubbe was part of a communist conspiracy to burn down the Reichstag and seize power, while the communists alleged that Van der Lubbe was part of the Nazi conspiracy to blame the crime on them. Van der Lubbe, for his part, maintained that he acted alone to protest against the condition of the German working class.

=== Posthumous restitution, 1967 to 2008 ===
In 1967, a court in West Berlin allowed the 1933 conviction to stand, but overturned the death sentence and posthumously changed Van der Lubbe's sentence to eight years in prison. In 1980, another court overturned the verdict, but was overruled. In 1981, a West German court posthumously overturned Van der Lubbe's 1933 conviction and found him not guilty by reason of insanity. This ruling was overturned. However, in January 2008, he was pardoned under a 1998 law for the crime on the grounds that anyone convicted under Nazi Germany is officially not guilty. The law allows pardons for people convicted of crimes under the Nazis, based on the idea that the laws of Nazi Germany "went against the basic ideas of justice".

== Dispute about Van der Lubbe's role ==
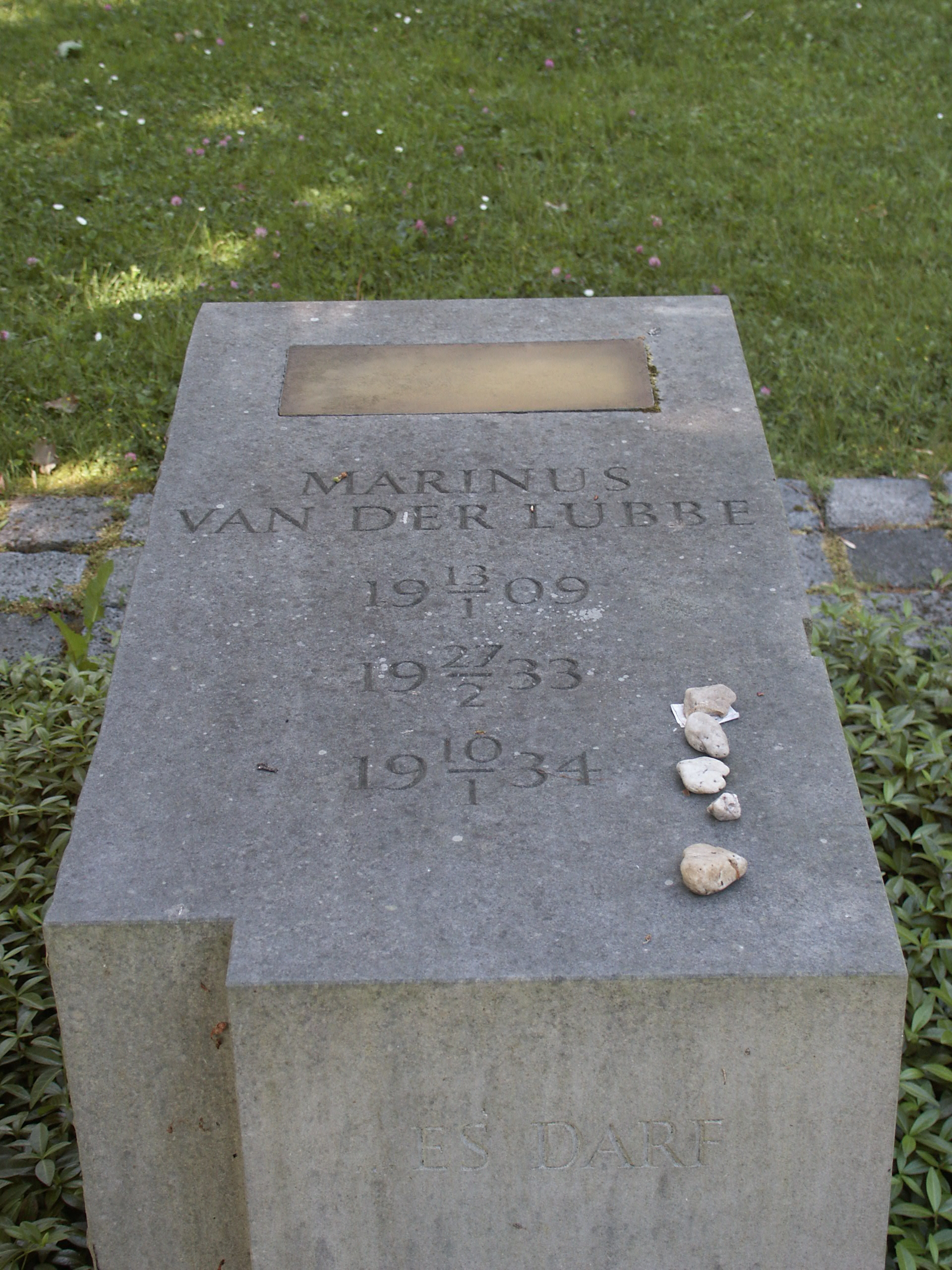
Memorial at the Südfriedhof in Leipzig

Attitudes as to whether Van der Lubbe acted alone or was used as a pawn or scapegoat in a Nazi conspiracy have swung back and forth over the years.

The British reporter Sefton Delmer, criticised for being a Nazi sympathiser at the time, witnessed that night's events. He reported Hitler arriving at the Reichstag, appearing uncertain how it began, and concerned that a communist coup was about to be launched. Delmer viewed Van der Lubbe as being solely responsible, but that the Nazis sought to make it appear to be a "communist gang" that set the fire. On the other hand, the communists sought to make it appear that Van der Lubbe was working for the Nazis, so each side constructed a conspiracy theory in which the other was the villain. According to Hitler's Table Talk, Hitler said in private of the chairman of the Communist Party, Ernst Torgler: "I'm convinced he was responsible for the burning of the Reichstag, but I can't prove it".

In the days following the incident, major newspapers in the US and London were skeptical of the good fortune of the Nazis in finding a communist scapegoat. John Gunther, who covered Van der Lubbe's trial, described him as "an obvious victim of manic-depressive psychosis" and said that the Nazis would not have chosen "an agent so inept and witless". Citing a letter that was allegedly written by Karl Ernst before his death during the Night of the Long Knives, Gunther believed that Nazis, who heard Van der Lubbe boast of planning to attack the Reichstag, started a second simultaneous fire they blamed on him. William Shirer drew a similar conclusion, seeing Van der Lubbe as a patsy:

Van der Lubbe, it seems clear, was a dupe of the Nazis. He was encouraged to try to set the Reichstag on fire. But the main job was to be done – without his knowledge, of course – by the storm troopers... He had only his shirt for tinder. The main fires, according to the testimony of experts at the trial, had been set with considerable quantities of chemicals and gasoline. It was obvious that one man could not have carried them into the building, nor would it have been possible for him to start so many fires in so many scattered places in so short a time.

In 1960, Fritz Tobias, a West German SPD public servant and part-time historian, published a series of articles in Der Spiegel, later turned into a book, in which he argued that Vаn der Lubbe had acted alone. Tobias showed that Van der Lubbe was a pyromaniac, with a long history of burning down buildings or attempting to burn them down. Tobias established that Van der Lubbe had committed a number of arson attacks on buildings in the days prior to 27 February.

In March 1973, the Swiss historian Walther Hofer organized a conference intended to rebut the claims made by Tobias. At the conference, Hofer claimed to have found evidence that some of the detectives who investigated the fire had been Nazis. Mommsen commented on Hofer's claims by stating: "Professor Hofer's rather helpless statement that the accomplices of Van der Lubbe 'could only have been Nazis' is tacit admission that the committee did not actually obtain any positive evidence in regard to the alleged accomplices' identity". Hans Mommsen also had a theory supporting Hofer, which was suppressed for political reasons, an act that he admitted was a serious breach of ethics. Mommsen concluded that the Nazi leadership was in a state of panic on the night of the Reichstag fire, and seemed to regard the fire as confirmation that a communist revolution was as imminent as they had claimed.

In 1998, historian Ian Kershaw argued that nearly all historians agreed that Van der Lubbe had set the Reichstag on fire, that he had acted alone, and that the incident was merely a stroke of good luck for the Nazis.

In 2014, historian Benjamin Carter Hett lamented that "Today the overwhelming consensus among historians who specialize in Nazi Germany remains that Marinus van der Lubbe burned the Reichstag all by himself". He has argued that Tobias' analysis is fundamentally flawed. Tobias undertook his study when tasked to defend West German police officials, who had investigated the initial fire as SS members. In doing so, Tobias disregarded any information from persons who had been targeted by the Nazi regime as biased while accepting the testimony of former SS members as objective, even though their post-war testimony is clearly contradicted by records from 1933. Furthermore, Hett showed that Tobias used his access to secret archives to coerce historians with opposing views by threatening to reveal compromising personal information. Hett argues that the most recent evidence makes clear that the fire could not have been the work of an individual and Hett feels there is far more evidence of Nazi collaboration than there is of a communist plot. Historian Richard J. Evans criticized Hett's claims giving a negative review of his book on the subject.

In 2019, mainstream German outlet Deutsche Welle (DW) reported that according to the sworn testimony of SA stormtrooper Hans-Martin Lennings in 1955 that had recently resurfaced, Van Der Lubbe could not have started the fire because the Reichstag was already on fire when he arrived with Van Der Lubbe, supporting new scholarship re-examining the subject.

=== "Countertrial" by the German Communist Party in exile, 1933 ===
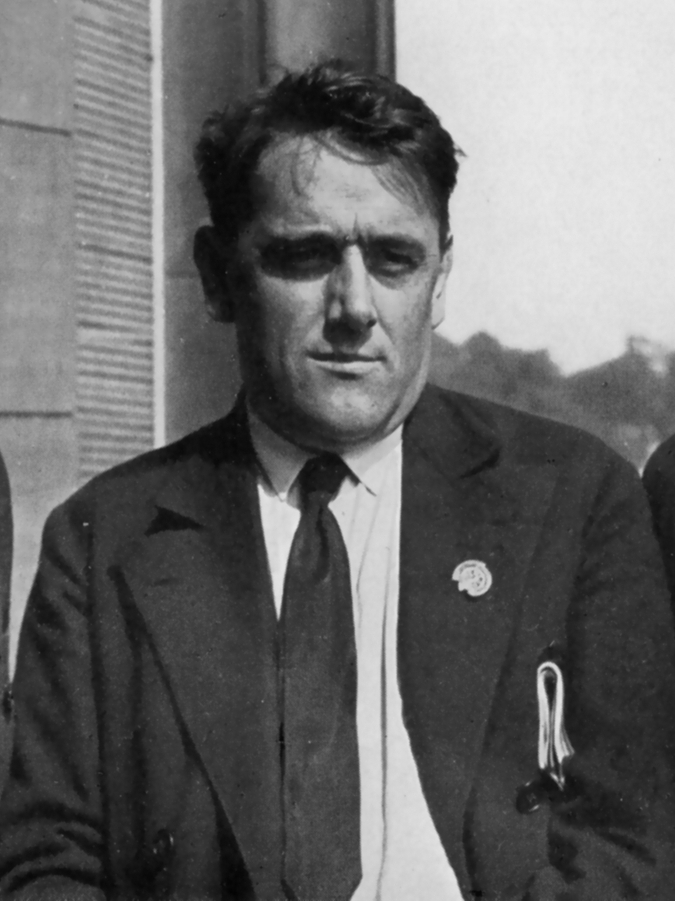
Willi Münzenberg

During the summer of 1933, a mock countertrial was organised in London by a group of lawyers, democrats and other anti-Nazis under the aegis of German communist émigrés. The chairman of the mock trial was British Labour Party barrister D. N. Pritt, and the chief organiser was the KPD propaganda chief Willi Münzenberg. The other "judges" were Piet Vermeylen of Belgium, George Branting of Sweden, Vincent de Moro-Giafferi and Gaston Bergery of France, Betsy Bakker-Nort, a lawyer and member of parliament of the Netherlands for the progressive liberal party Free-thinking Democratic League, Vald Hvidt of Denmark, and Arthur Garfield Hays of the United States.

The mock trial began 21 September 1933. It lasted one week and ended with the conclusion that the defendants were innocent and the true initiators of the fire were to be found amid the leading Nazi Party elite. The countertrial received much media attention, and Sir Stafford Cripps delivered the opening speech. Göring was found guilty at the mock trial, which served as a workshop that tested all possible scenarios, and all speeches of the defendants had been prepared. Most of the "judges", such as Hays and Moro-Giafferi, complained that the atmosphere at the "countertrial" was more like a show trial, with Münzenberg constantly applying pressure behind the scenes on the "judges" to deliver the "right" verdict, without any regard for the truth. One of the "witnesses", a supposed SA man, appeared in court wearing a mask and claimed that it was the SA that had really set the fire. In fact, the "SA man" was Albert Norden, the editor of the German communist newspaper Rote Fahne. Another masked witness, whom Hays described as "not very reliable", claimed that Van der Lubbe was a drug addict and a homosexual, who was the lover of Ernst Röhm and a Nazi dupe. When the lawyer for Ernst Torgler asked the mock trial organisers to turn over the "evidence" that exonerated his client, Münzenberg refused the request because he lacked any "evidence" to exonerate or to convict anyone of the crime.

The countertrial was an enormously successful publicity stunt for the German communists. Münzenberg followed the triumph with another by writing, under his name, the bestselling The Brown Book of the Reichstag Fire and Hitler Terror, an exposé of what Münzenberg alleged to be the Nazi conspiracy to burn down the Reichstag and to blame the act on the communists. (As with all of Münzenberg's other books, the real author was one of his aides: in this case, the Czechoslovak communist Otto Katz.) The success of The Brown Book was followed by another, published in 1934, dealing with the trial.

=== Göring's alleged commentary, 1943 ===
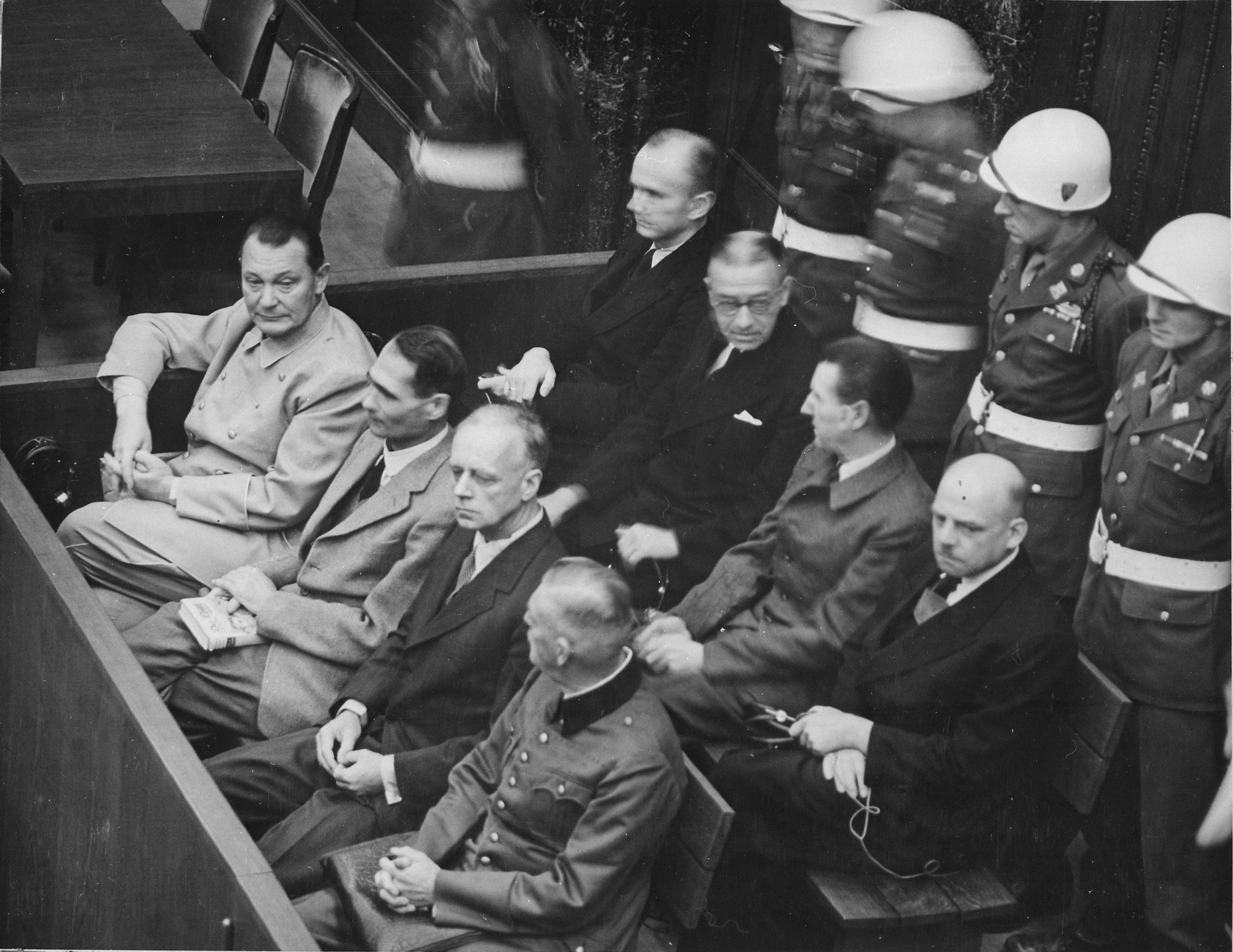
Göring (first row, far left) at the Nuremberg trials

In The Rise and Fall of the Third Reich, William L. Shirer wrote that at the Nuremberg Trials, General Franz Halder stated in an affidavit that Hermann Göring had boasted about setting the fire: "On the occasion of a lunch on the Führer's birthday in 1943, the people around the Führer turned the conversation to the Reichstag building and its artistic value. I heard with my own ears how Göring broke into the conversation and shouted: 'The only one who really knows about the Reichstag building is I, for I set fire to it.' And saying this he slapped his thigh". Under cross-examination at the Nuremberg trial in 1945 and 1946, Halder's affidavit was read to Göring, who denied any involvement in the fire.

=== 1955 testimony of SA member Hans-Martin Lennings ===
In July 2019, more than 80 years after the event, Germany's Hannoversche Allgemeine Zeitung and the RedaktionsNetzwerk Deutschland published a 1955 affidavit, uncovered in some papers of Fritz Tobias, which were found in the archives of the Amtsgericht ('court') in Hannover. The affidavit by Martin Lennings (1904–1962), a former member of the Nazis' paramilitary SA unit, stated that on the night of the fire, he and his SA group drove Van der Lubbe from an infirmary to the Reichstag, where they noticed "a strange smell of burning and there were clouds of smoke billowing through the rooms". The statement suggests the fire had already started when they arrived and that the SA played a role in the arson.

Lennings, who died in 1962, further stated in his account that he and other members of his squad had protested the arrest of Van der Lubbe, "because we were convinced that Van der Lubbe could not possibly have been the arsonist, because according to our observation, the Reichstag had already been burning when we dropped him off there". He claimed he and the other witnesses were detained and forced to sign a paper that denied any knowledge of the incident. Later, nearly all of those with knowledge of the Reichstag fire were executed. Lennings said that he had been warned and escaped to Czechoslovakia.

Lennings had asked that his account be certified in 1955, in the event the Reichstag fire case ever returned to trial.

The uncovering of Lennings's affidavit led to the speculation that Tobias had ignored it to protect his single perpetrator theory on the arson, and to protect the post-war career of former Nazis. It also led to more sober speculation about whether unknown or forgotten documents might still be hidden in German archives, and which might be valuable and revealing historical sources, especially on the Nazi regime.

== German government exonerates Van der Lubbe ==
The federal prosecutor, Monika Harms overturned the conviction of Van Der Lubbe in January 2008, under a 1998 law. A Berlin court had changed the sentence to an eight-year prison term in 1967. The same court then lifted the sentence completely in 1980; however this decision was later reversed by the federal court. In 1980, a West German court overturned the conviction on the basis that Van der Lubbe was insane. Campaigners kept demanding for full state pardon arguing that he had been convicted by a Nazi court and an Act was passed in 1998 making a full pardon possible.

== See also ==
- A Lesson in History
- List of attacks on legislatures

== Sources ==
- Evans, Richard J. (2004). The Coming of the Third Reich. New York: Penguin. ISBN 1594200041.
- Hett, Benjamin Carter (2014). Burning the Reichstag: An Investigation into the Third Reich's Enduring Mystery. Oxford: Oxford University Press. ISBN 9780199322329.
- Hett, Benjamin Carter (2015). "This Story Is about Something Fundamental: Nazi Criminals, History, Memory, and the Reichstag Fire". Central European History. 48 (2): 199–224. doi:10.1017/S0008938915000345. JSTOR 43965146. S2CID 146728286.
- Kershaw, Ian (1998). Hitler, 1889–1936: Hubris. London: Allen Lane.
- Koonz, Claudia (2003). The Nazi Conscience. Belknap Press. p. 33. ISBN 0674011724.
- Mommsen, Hans (1972). "The Reichstag Fire and Its Political Consequences". In Holborn, Hajo (ed.). Republic to Reich The Making of the Nazi Revolution. New York: Pantheon Books. pp. 129–222.
- Shirer, William Lawrence (1959). The Rise and Fall of the Third Reich. New York: Touchstone.
- Shirer, William Lawrence (1960). The Rise and Fall of the Third Reich: A History of Nazi Germany (Third Printing ed.). New York City: Simon & Schuster. ASIN B0766DKDLR. LCCN 60006729. OCLC 1286630. OL 5794925M. Wikidata Q138029595.
- Shirer, William Lawrence (1991). The Rise and Fall of the Third Reich. London: Mandarin. ISBN 0749306971.
- Snyder, Louis Leo (1976). Encyclopedia of the Third Reich. McGraw-Hill, Inc. ISBN 978-0-07-059525-5. LCCN 75025740. OCLC 1582728. OL 5201515M. Wikidata Q135942187.
- Tobias, Fritz (1964). The Reichstag Fire. New York: Putnam.
- Zentner, Christian [in German]; Bedürftig, Friedemann [in German], eds. (1997) [1991]. The Encyclopedia of the Third Reich. Translated by Hackett, Amy. New York City: Da Capo Press. ISBN 978-0-306-80793-0. LCCN 97012744. OCLC 906737005. OL 667032M. Wikidata Q106426929.
