= Blagoy Popov =

Bulgarian communist (1902–1968)

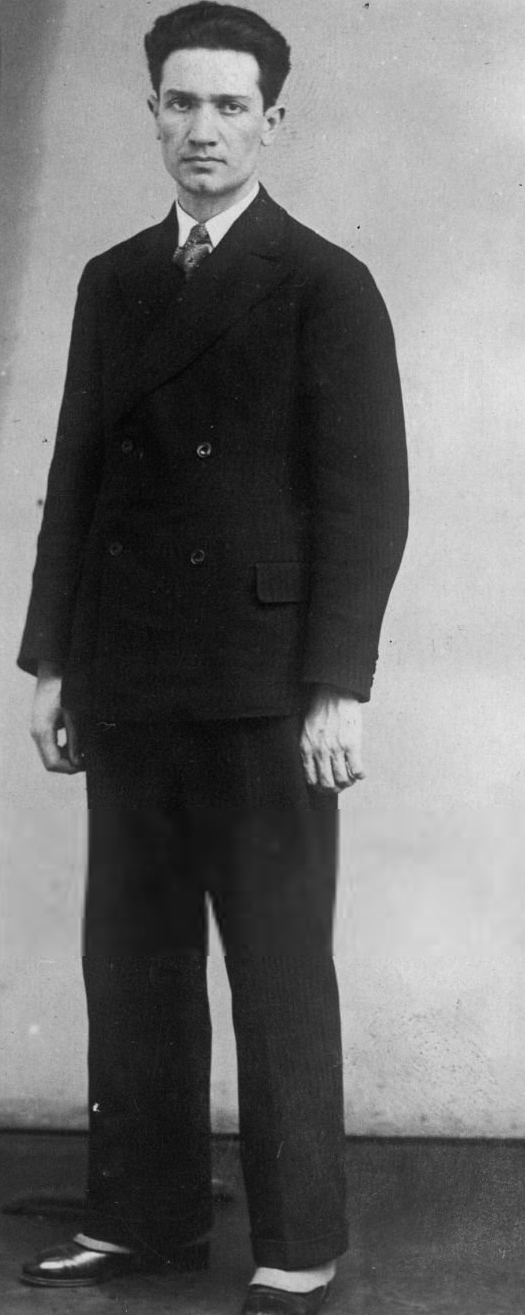
Popov in 1933

Blagoy Simeonov Popov (Bulgarian: Благой Симеонов Попов) (22 November 1902, Dren, Pernik Province – 28 December 1968, Varna) was a Bulgarian Communist activist and Comintern executive who was one of the co-defendants along with Georgi Dimitrov and Vasil Tanev in the Leipzig trial.

After the trial, Popov moved to Moscow in February 1934. He studied there until 1937 when he was caught up in the Stalinist purges. He spent the next seventeen years in a Soviet Gulag until he was officially rehabilitated in 1954. Popov returned to Bulgaria in the same year. He worked in various ministries. In 1968, after a series of ups and downs, he managed to finish his memoirs about the camps in Siberia and died a few months later. His memoirs were illegally exported and published in France in 1970. The book contains sharp criticism of the Soviet authorities, personally of Georgi Dimitrov and especially of Vasil Kolarov.
