= Ernst Torgler =

German politician (1893–1963)

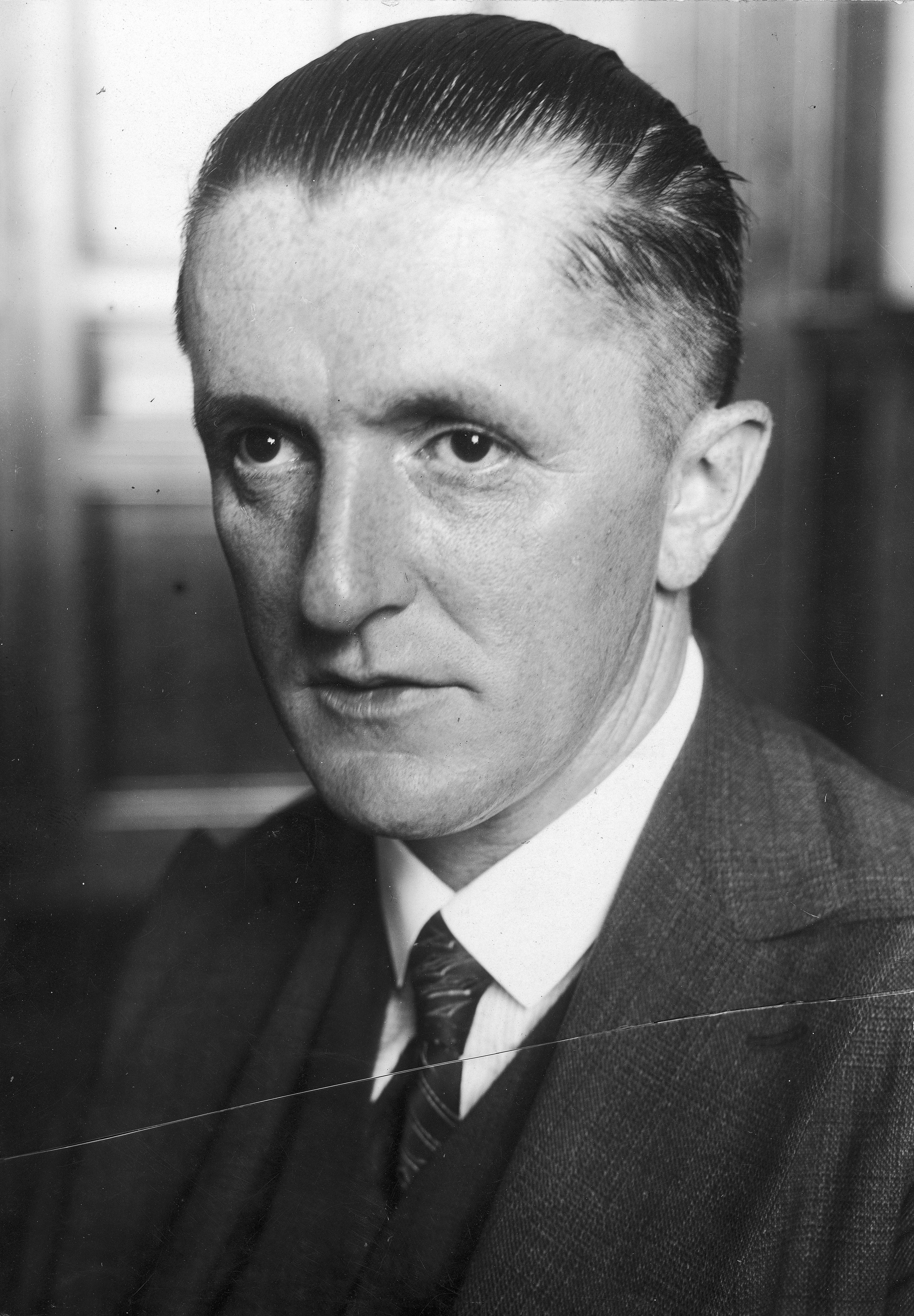
- Torgler in 1933

Member of the Reichstag for Berlin
- In office 5 January 1925 – 28 February 1933
- Preceded by: Multi-member district
- Succeeded by: Constituency abolished

Personal details
- Born: April 25, 1893 Berlin, German Empire
- Died: January 19, 1963 (aged 69) Hanover, West Germany
- Party: SPD (1910–1917, 1949–1963); USPD (1917–1920); KPD (1920–1935)
- Children: Kurt Torgler (1919–1943)

Military service
- Allegiance: German Empire
- Branch/service: Imperial German Army
- Battles/wars: World War I

Ernst Torgler (25 April 1893 – 19 January 1963) was the last chairman of the Communist Party of Germany (KPD) faction in the German Reichstag. He later worked for the Nazis.

== Early life ==
Torgler was born the son of an urban resident in Berlin. There, he attended school from 1904 to 1907, when he joined the Association of Apprentices and Juvenile Workers of Berlin. From 1909 to 1925, he held a variety of different jobs, working most notably as a salesman and accountant. Torgler began his political career in 1910, when he joined the Social Democratic Party of Germany (SPD). While he served in the military during World War I, Torgler became a member of the Independent Social Democratic Party of Germany (USPD) in 1917.

== Political career ==
In 1920, Torgler joined the KPD when the USPD merged with the KPD. A year later, Torgler became a city councillor in Berlin-Lichtenberg, a position he held until 1930, and he was elected to the Reichstag in the December 1924 German federal election as a member of the KPD. Torgler then became deputy chairman of the KPD Reichstag faction in 1927 and chairman in 1929, which made him one of the most powerful members of the party. From 1932 to 1933, Torgler published the KPD Reichstag news-sheet The Red Voter with Wilhelm Pieck. Torgler's political career ended in February 1933 because of the Reichstag fire.

== Reichstag fire ==
Against the wishes of the KPD leadership, Torgler voluntarily handed himself over to the police on 28 February, the day after the fire, when Hermann Göring issued a warrant for his arrest. Torgler was kept in custody, and in July 1933 was charged with arson and treason. Torgler and his fellow defendants were tried from 21 September to 23 December, when Torgler was acquitted because of a lack of evidence against him.

== Work for Nazis ==
After his trial, Torgler was placed into "protective custody" by the police until 1935. The KPD leadership, now in Brussels as a result of being banned by the Nazis, then expelled Torgler from the party because of his surrender to the police. Heinz Linge recounted in his memoirs, published under the title With Hitler to the End, that Torgler was eventually released as part of an amnesty offered to the former leaders and pre-eminents of banned parties, on the condition that they make signed statements that they would not partake again in political activity that would be to the detriment of the regime (something that Linge suggested Ernst Thälmann refused to do). After his release, Torgler lived just outside Berlin under a pseudonym and worked for the Gestapo. In 1938, Torgler worked for Electrolux and was carefully watched by the SD. In June 1940, Torgler began working for the Nazi Propaganda Ministry. In 1941, after Nazi Germany invaded the Soviet Union, Torgler worked on anti-Bolshevik propaganda at the behest of Joseph Goebbels.

According to Adolf Hitler's valet Heinz Linge, Torgler renounced communism in a written letter to Hitler. Linge recounted in his memoirs that Torgler had done this having heard from his son, who had served on the Eastern Front, about the horrid conditions that the "Russian worker" had been enduring under Joseph Stalin. He was so appalled by his son's testimony that he took it upon himself to pen the letter to his former political rival. Hitler supposedly reacted happily, stating in Linge's presence: "We should send all German Communists to Russia, to see the paradise for themselves." Torgler was then employed as a real estate auditor in the main trust center East in Graudenz, later in Trebbin. In 1944, after the 20 July Plot against Hitler, an arrest warrant was issued for Torgler. According to his own statements, a personal intervention by Goebbels prevented his imprisonment. With his office, he reached Bückeburg in 1945 on the retreat.

== Postwar ==
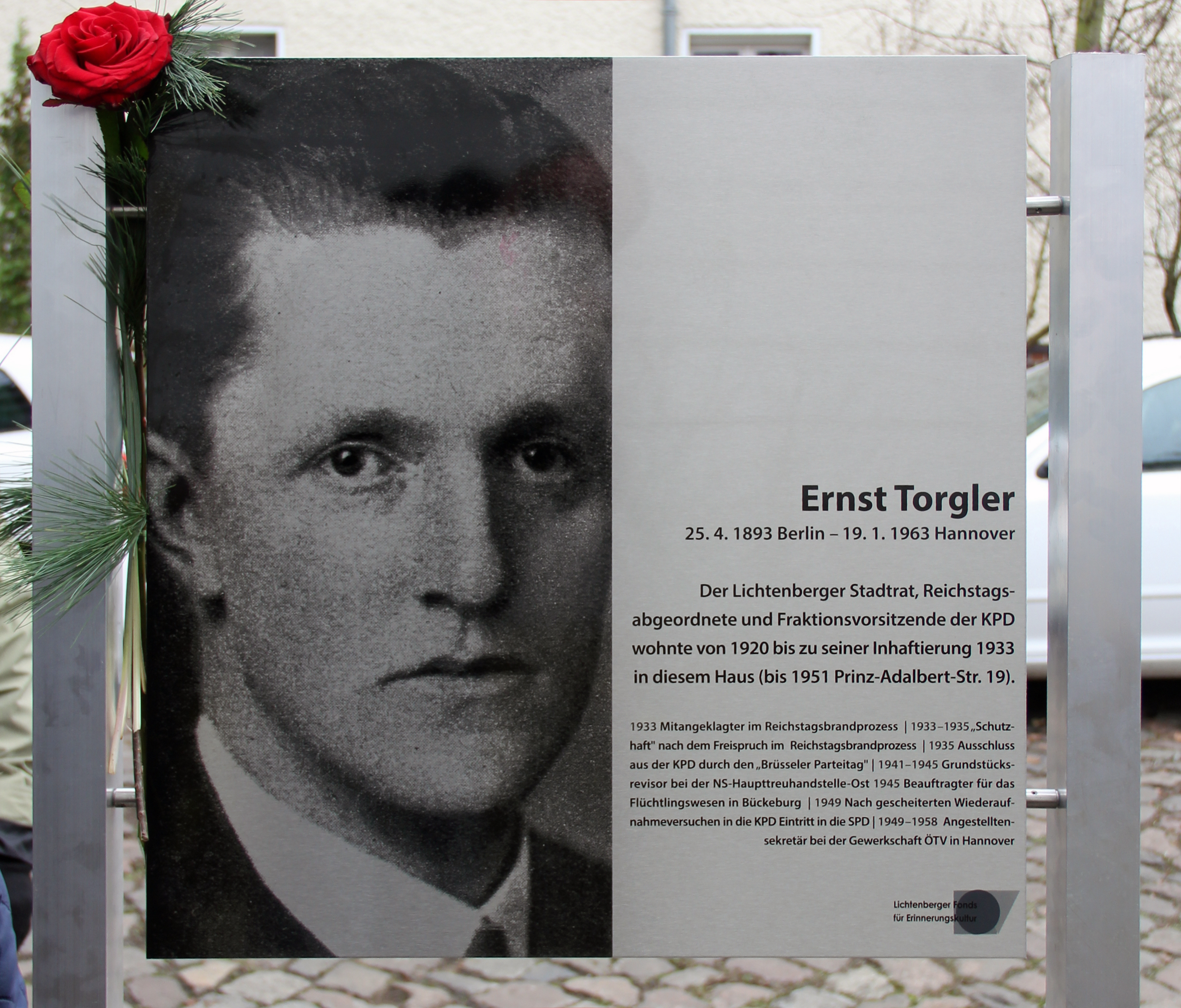
Memorial plaque of Torgler in Karlshorst

After World War II, Torgler was denazified and landed a job with the administration of Bückeburg, with help of the US Army. Despite the hard times, Torgler managed to keep himself in a well-paid position. Torgler angrily dismissed charges that he had willingly co-operated with the Nazis. He tried to join the KPD but was rejected. In 1949, he became a member of the SPD and in 1950 moved to Bückeburg, where he drifted into obscurity. He died in Hanover in 1963.

== Family ==
His son, Kurt Torgler (1919–1943), was a witness on behalf of his father at the 1933 countertrial in London that was organised by the KAP on the Reichstag fire. In 1935, he went to the Soviet Union. There, he was arrested by the NKVD in 1937 and sent to a labour camp. After the Molotov–Ribbentrop Pact, he was handed over to the German government in 1940. He became a translator in the Wehrmacht and died on the Eastern Front.

== Sources ==
- Reichstag handbook, 1933
