= Vasil Tanev =

Bulgarian Communist (1897–1941)

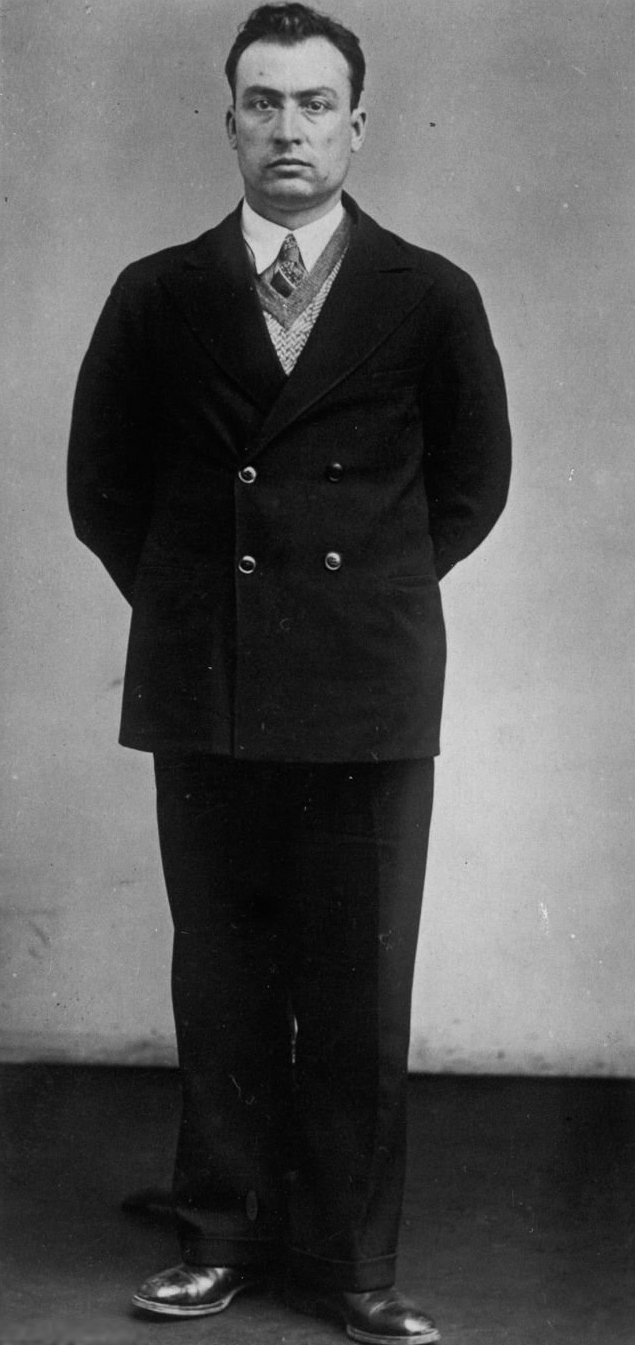
Tanev in 1933

Vasil Konstantinov Tanev (Bulgarian: Васил Константинов Танев; 9 October 1897 – 21 November 1941) was a Bulgarian Communist, one of the three Bulgarian Comintern operatives arrested and tried for complicity in the Reichstag fire in 1933.

== Biography ==
Tanev was born in Gevgelija, in the Salonica Vilayet of the Ottoman Empire (present-day North Macedonia) and joined the Bulgarian Communist Party in 1919. After the failure of the September Uprising of 1923 he fled to the Kingdom of Yugoslavia, then moved between Communist Russia and secret missions in Bulgaria.

In 1933 Tanev was in Germany working for the Comintern under Georgi Dimitrov. On 9 March 1933 Tanev, Dimitrov and Blagoy Popov, along with others were arrested and charged with complicity in the Reichstag fire. All three were acquitted.

Tanev was acclaimed as a hero on his return to the USSR, but was forced into self-denunciation later in the 1930s. After the German attack on the Soviet Union in 1941, he volunteered for the Red Army. Tanev became a member of a special combat group that took off by plane in October 1941 with the task of organizing sabotage activities in Bulgaria. On October 6, he was parachuted by mistake in the German occupation zone in Greece, near the border with the Bulgarian occupation zone. The group failed to cross into Bulgaria as intended, and he was killed by the Germans near Langadas, Greece.
