= Gay Nazis myth =

Myth that homosexuals pervaded the Nazi Party

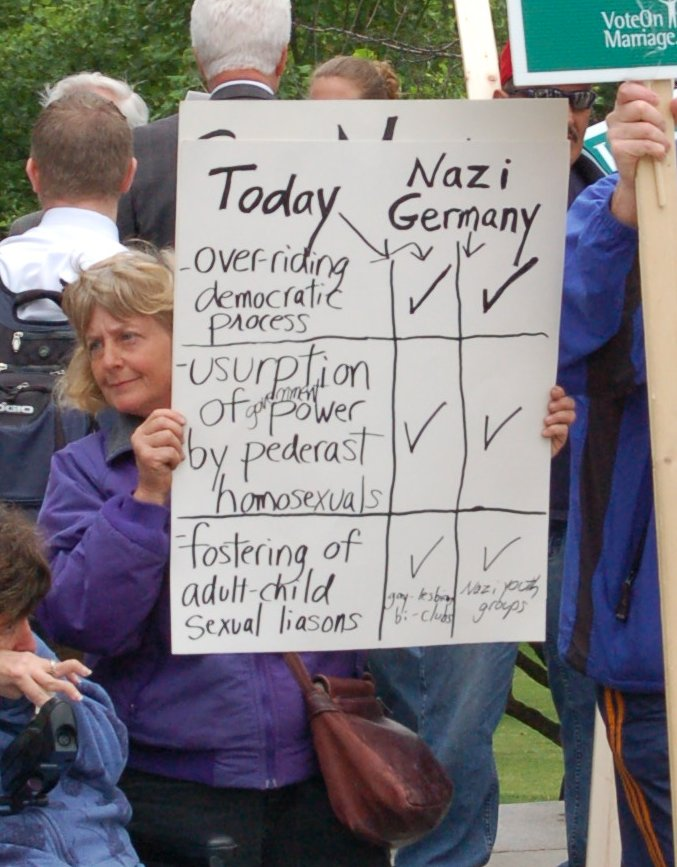
Protester opposing same-sex marriage in Boston, 2007

There is a widespread and long-lasting myth alleging that homosexuals were numerous and prominent as a group in the Nazi Party (Note: "Antifascist leftists created the impression that homosexuality was widespread in Nazi organizations."; Prominent as a group) or the identification of Nazism with homosexuality more generally. (Note: "In Western Europe as well as the Soviet Union, there was a general tendency among socialists in the 1930s to identify homosexuality with Nazism...The stereotype of homosexuality as a characteristic not just of individual Nazis but of the Nazi system as a whole was firmly established during three episodes: (1) the Röhm affair in 1931-32; (2) the Reichstag fire in 1933, when the destruction of the parliament building was followed by mass arrests of the Nazi regime's political opponents; and (3) the so-called Night of the Long Knives or Röhm putsch in 1934, when a large number of the leaders of the SA (Sturmabteilung), the paramilitary troops of the Nazi party, were liquidated for political reasons.") It has been promoted by various individuals and groups from before World War II through to the present day, especially by left-wing Germans during the Nazi era and the Christian right in the United States more recently. Although some gay men joined the Nazi Party, there is no evidence that they were overrepresented. The Nazis harshly criticized homosexuality and severely persecuted gay men, going as far as murdering them en masse. Therefore, historians regard the myth as having no merit. (Note: "Although remarkably long-lived, mutable, capable of regenerating itself in various contexts, and even entertained at times by reputable historians, the myth of legions of gay Nazis has no historical basis."; Erwin J. Haeberle wrote: "It is often assumed by casual students of Nazism that Hitler and many Nazi leaders were originally quite tolerant of homosexuality, that the entire SA leadership, for example, was homosexual, and that the intolerance set in only after the murder of Rohm and his friends in 1934. However, all these assumptions are false."; The claim that "gay people helped bring Nazism to Germany... [is] a flat-out lie".)

== Background ==
Nazi propaganda asserted that "homosexual emancipation was a Jewish conspiracy to undermine the German Volk's morality". In 1928, the Nazi Party responded to a question about their position on Paragraph 175, the German law criminalizing homosexuality, writing that "Anyone who even thinks of homosexual love is our enemy." According to Laurie Marhoefer, a small number of gay men belonged to a covert faction within the Nazi party, including SA leaders Ernst Röhm and Edmund Heines, that favored gay emancipation while denigrating feminists, Jews, and leftists.

After the Nazis took power in Germany, homosexuals were persecuted. About 100,000 men were arrested, 50,000 convicted and some 5,000 to 15,000 interned in Nazi concentration camps, where they were forced to wear pink triangle badges. Some underwent castration or other Nazi human experimentation aimed at curing homosexuality. Adolf Hitler signed an edict that SS and police personnel would be subject to capital punishment if caught engaging in homosexual activity.

== History ==
=== Origins ===
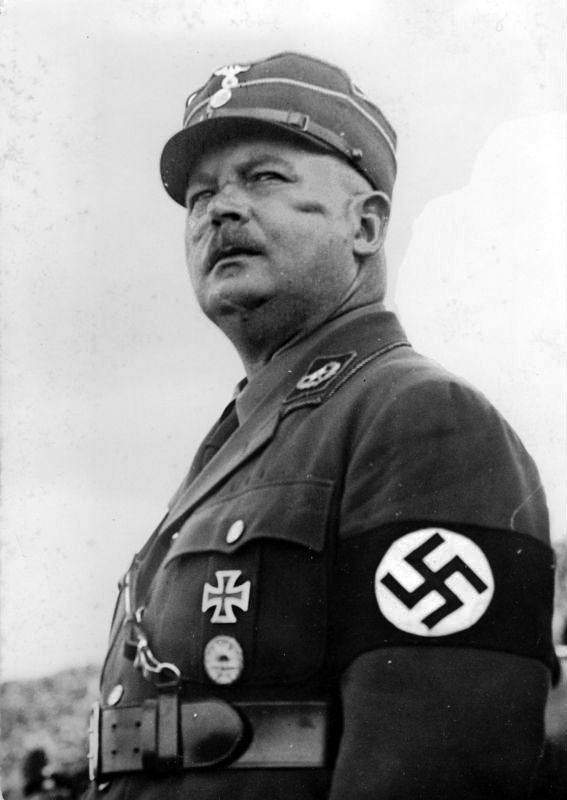
Ernst Röhm, a prominent Nazi known for his homosexuality

The myth is nearly as old as the Nazi Party itself. The Social Democratic Party of Germany (SPD) and Communist Party of Germany (KPD) were nominal supporters of repealing Paragraph 175, the German law criminalizing homosexuality, but they also opportunistically used accusations of homosexuality against political opponents. Contemporaries noted the hypocrisy of this approach. Historian Christopher Dillon comments, "While far from German Social Democracy's finest hour morally... it was a shrewd tactic politically". Confronted with the rise of Nazism, they exploited a stereotype associating homosexuality with militarism that had been established during the Eulenburg affair and exploited the homosexuality of a few Nazis, especially Ernst Röhm, for propaganda. For example, in 1927, SPD deputies heckled Nazi deputy Wilhelm Frick, shouting "Hitler, heil, heil, heil. Heil Eulenburg!" after Frick called for harsh penalties for homosexuality. Leftist paramilitaries taunted the SA with shouts of Geil Röhm ("Hot Röhm!"), Schwul Heil ("Heil Gay") or SA, Hose Runter! ("SA, Trousers Down!"). In 1931, the SPD revealed Röhm's homosexuality and attempted to have him convicted under Paragraph 175, in an effort to prevent or delay the Nazi seizure of power at a time when the defenders of Weimar democracy sensed that they were running out of options.

The worldwide bestseller The Brown Book of the Reichstag Fire and Hitler Terror (1933)—a brainchild of KPD politician Willi Münzenberg—claimed that Röhm's assistant Georg Bell, who was murdered in early 1933 in Austria, had been his pimp and had procured Reichstag arsonist Marinus van der Lubbe for Röhm. The book claimed that a clique of homosexual stormtroopers led by Edmund Heines set the Reichstag fire; van der Lubbe remained behind and agreed to accept the sole blame because of his desperation for affection; Bell was killed to cover it up. There was no evidence for these claims, and in fact Heines was several hundred kilometers away at the time. Nevertheless, the matter was so politically explosive that it was aired at van der Lubbe's trial in Leipzig. Wackerfuss states that Reichstag conspiracy appealed to antifascists because of their preexisting belief that "the heart of the Nazis' militant nationalist politics lay in the sinister schemes of decadent homosexual criminals".

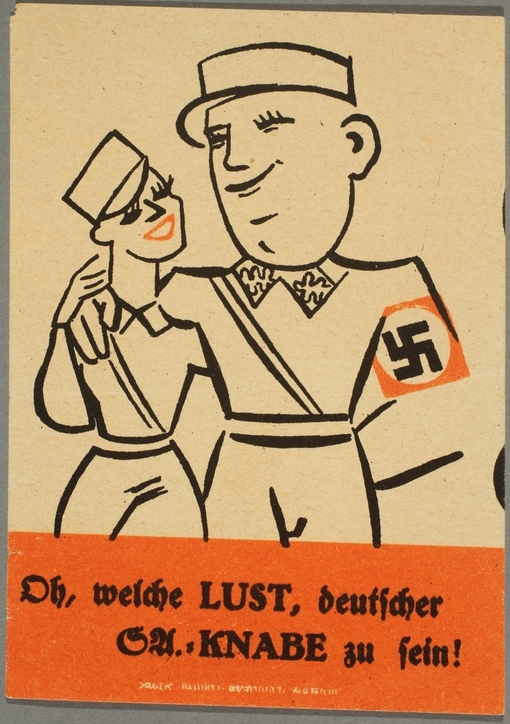
A 1932 Austrofascist propaganda suggesting the Nazi Party is dominated by homosexuals. The caption, translated, reads "Oh, what a pleasure it is, being a German SA boy!"

Speculation on the supposed homosexuality of various Nazi leaders, especially Rudolf Hess, Baldur von Schirach, and Hitler himself, was popular in the media of the exiled German opposition. In the Soviet Union, writer Maxim Gorky claimed that "eradicating homosexuals [will make] fascism disappear". Leftists, even those who were themselves gay, continued to hold an aversion to all non-monogamous or non-heterosexual sex. Gay antifascists had to stay in the closet in order to avoid rejection by their movement.

Hitler exaggerated the homosexuality in the SA in order to justify the 1934 purge of the SA leadership (the Night of the Long Knives). According to British historian Daniel Siemens, it was the Nazis, not the left, who were most responsible for the lasting impression of the SA as homosexual.

Other anti-Nazis, such as Kurt Tucholsky writing in the left-liberal Die Weltbühne in 1932, rejected the idea of attacking opponents for their personal lives. Regarding the Röhm scandal, he commented, "We fight the scandalous §175, everywhere we can, therefore we must not join the choir of those among us who want to banish a man from society because he is homosexual." German writer Klaus Mann (himself homosexual) wrote in a polemical essay, "'Vice' and the Left" (1934), that homosexuals had become the "Jews of the antifascists". He also denounced the equation of the fascist Männerbund and homosexuality. Mann concluded:

In the Third Reich gays are regularly being rounded up and put in work camps or even castrated and executed. Outside Germany they are derided in the leftist press and the German émigré community. We are at the point where homosexuals are being made scapegoats on all sides. In any case homosexuality is not going to be 'rooted out' and, if it were, it would leave civilization poorer.

Although Mann was one of the most prominent intellectuals among exiled Germans, his essay was ignored.

=== Germany's National Vice ===
In 1945, Samuel Igra, a German Jew who had spent the war in England, published a book, Germany's National Vice, claiming that "there is a causal connection between mass sexual perversion" and German war crimes during both world wars. This was a new element not present in the 1930s antifascist discourse. Igra approvingly quoted British diplomat Robert Smallbones, who wrote in 1938 that "The explanation for this outbreak of sadistic cruelty may be that sexual perversion, in particular homo-sexuality, are very prevalent in Germany." He argued that since both Judaism and Christianity have traditionally condemned homosexuality, "the Jews were the natural enemies of homosexual Nazi leaders such as Hitler and Röhm". Igra wrote:

I think it is reasonable to hold that the psychological forces that let loose the sadistic orgies of the concentration camps, the mass murders in Germany, ... and the subsequent atrocities in the occupied countries may be attributed mainly to one source and that this source is the moral perversion which was rampant among the Nazi leaders and which had its typical embodiment in Hitler himself.

British scholar Gregory Woods describes Igra's book as "a sustained and obsessive pursuit of the myth of Fascistic homosexuality". Igra's argument is undermined by his failure to explain the Nazi persecution of homosexuals or to justify his claim that homosexuality increases antisemitism. According to Woods, Igra's claims have "reappeared at regular intervals ever since the war".

=== Postwar literature and film ===
Historian and sociologist Harry Oosterhuis identified the movies The Damned by Luchino Visconti (1969), The Conformist by Bernardo Bertolucci (1971), Salò or the 120 Days of Sodom by Pier Paolo Pasolini (1975), and The Tin Drum by Volker Schlöndorff (1978) as repeating the trope of a connection between homosexuality and Nazism. He also identifies Theodor W. Adorno, Maria Antonietta Macciocchi, and Reimut Reiche as writers who employ this trope. Susan Sontag also claimed that "there is a natural link" between fascism and sadomasochism between men.

=== Anti-LGBTQ activism ===
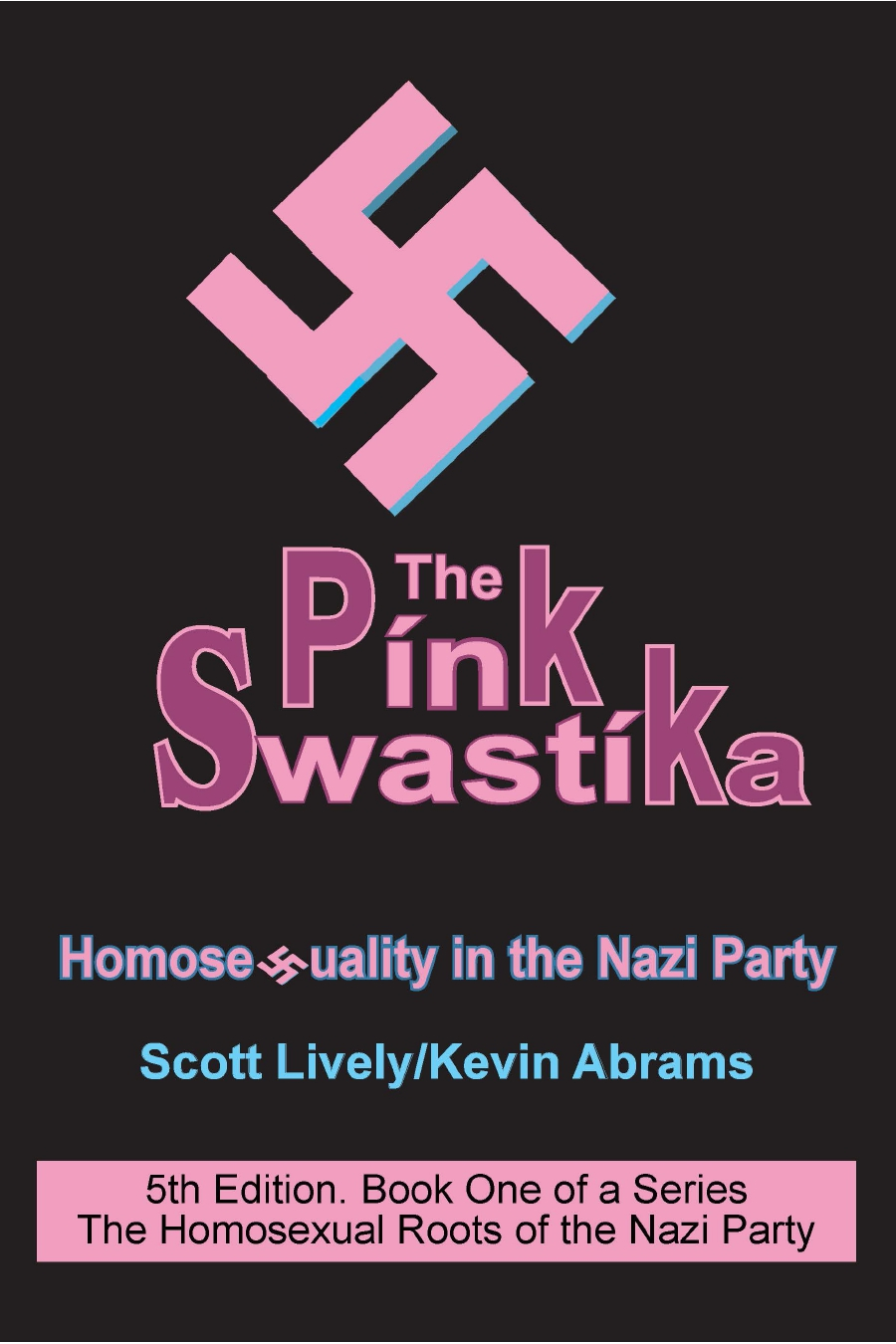
The Pink Swastika, a 1995 book which promoted the myth

Pat Robertson also promoted the idea of gay Nazis, claiming that "Many of those people involved with Adolf Hitler were satanists. Many of them were homosexuals. The two seem to go together". The idea was promoted in the 1995 book The Pink Swastika: Homosexuality in the Nazi Party by Scott Lively and Kevin Abrams. The alleged connection between homosexuality and Nazism has attained some popularity on the American right, being promoted by such groups as the American Family Association. In 1993, the Family Research Institute sent out a newspaper asking "Was the Young Hitler a Homosexual Prostitute?", citing Igra's book as proof that Hitler was a homosexual before his rise to power. The anti-gay advocacy group Oregon Citizens Alliance claimed:

Homosexuality was a CENTRAL element of the fascist system, that the Nazi elite was rampant with homosexuality and pederasty, that Adolph Hitler intentionally surrounded himself with homosexuals during his entire adult life, and that the people most responsible for many Nazi atrocities were homosexual.

In 2015, statements that LGBTQ activists were "jack-booted homofascist thugs" and that Hitler was a homosexual were among the controversies that led to Republican National Committee official Bryan Fischer being fired. Fischer also claimed that the Nazi party was founded at "a gay bar in Munich", that only Nazis who were "hardcore homosexuals" could advance in the party ranks, and that "Homosexual activists... [will] do the same thing to you that the Nazis did to their opponents in Nazi Germany". During the 2015 Irish referendum on same-sex marriage, psychologist and No advocate Gerard van den Aardweg "claimed the Nazi party was 'rooted' in homosexuals". In Death of a Nation, a 2018 film praised by Donald Trump Jr., Dinesh D'Souza incorrectly claimed that Hitler did not persecute homosexuals in Nazi Germany.

== Reception ==
=== Historicity ===
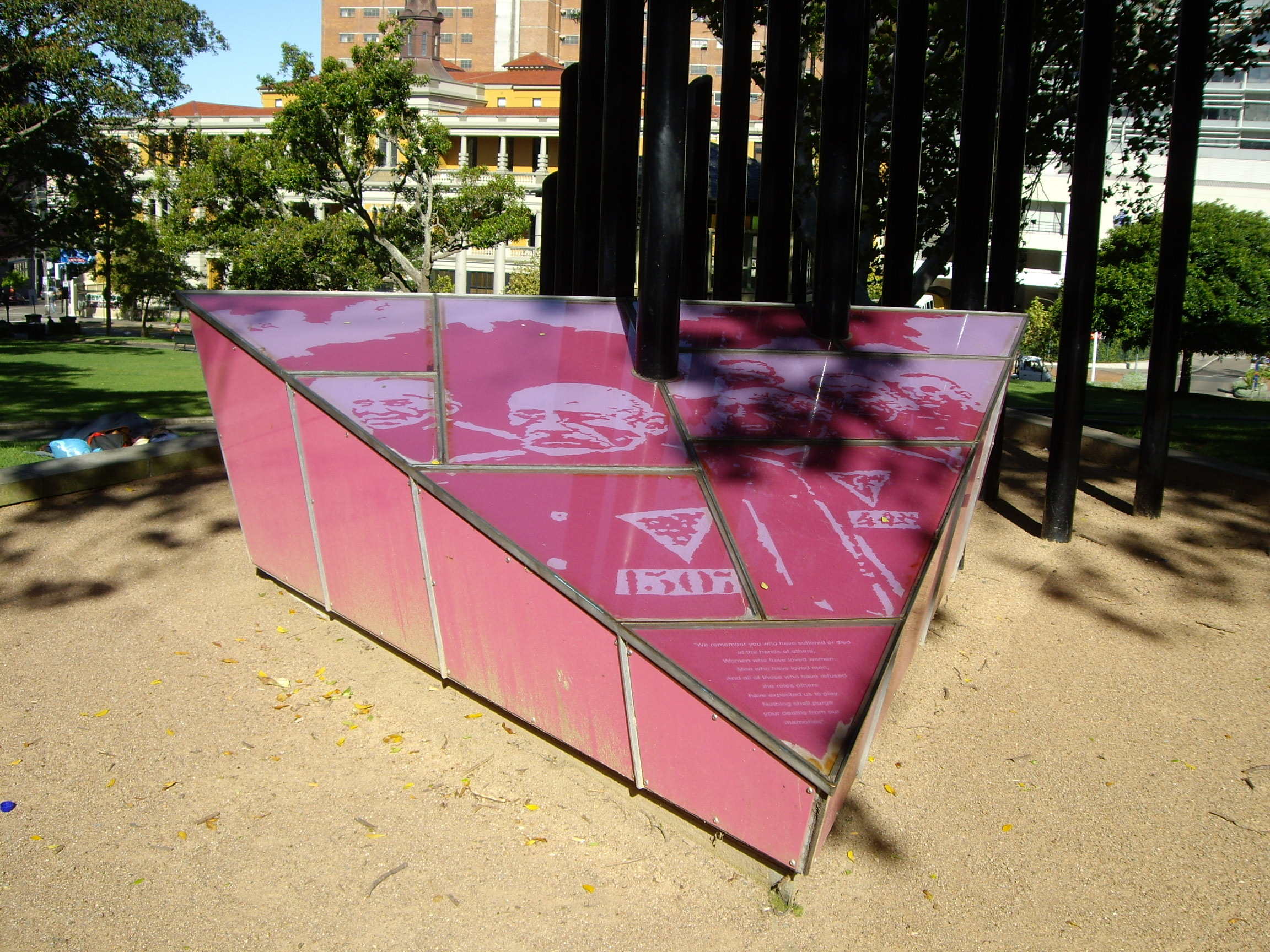
Sydney Gay and Lesbian Holocaust Memorial

American sociologist Arlene Stein acknowledges that while there was a degree of homoeroticism in Nazi sports and physical culture, which was channeled into "militarism, brutality, and ideological fixations on powerful leadership figures," this does not prove revisionist claims. She notes that the Nazis "identified homosexuality with the emasculation of men", which threatened the traditional family praised in Nazi propaganda. The German sociologist Erwin J. Haeberle wrote: "It is often assumed by casual students of Nazism that Hitler and many Nazi leaders were originally quite tolerant of homosexuality, that the entire SA leadership, for example, was homosexual, and that the intolerance set in only after the murder of Rohm and his friends in 1934. However, all these assumptions are false."

There is no evidence that homosexuals were overrepresented in the Nazi Party, which Siemens considers unlikely because of the Nazis' homophobic politics. Historian Laurie Marhoefer concludes: "Although remarkably long-lived, mutable, capable of regenerating itself in various contexts, and even entertained at times by reputable historians, the myth of legions of gay Nazis has no historical basis". Daniel Siemens listed Alexander Zinn, Jörn Meve, and Andreas Pretzel as writers on the historiography of gay Nazis who would agree with Marhoefer's statement.

According to American historian Andrew Wackerfuss in the book Stormtrooper Families, both Hitler and Lively endorsed the idea that there was a "sinister, scheming cult" within the SA which was "responsible for fascism’s excesses", but in fact homosexual SA members were located within broader heterosexual networks and were not especially evil. Wackerfuss emphasizes that "The vast majority of homosexuals have been antifascist, while the vast majority of fascists have been heterosexuals", and that there is nothing inherently fascist about homosexuality or vice versa. Writing in Journal of the History of Sexuality, Erik N. Jensen regards the linkage of homosexuality and Nazism as the recurrence of a "pernicious myth... long since dispelled" by "serious scholarship". In the 1970s, gays and lesbians began to use the pink triangle as a symbol, partly as an attempt to rebut "the vicious, influential myth created by antifascists that Nazis were themselves, in some basic way, homosexual", in the words of historian Jonathan Ned Katz. Historian Jonathan Zimmerman described the claim that "gay people helped bring Nazism to Germany" as "a flat-out lie".

In 2014, German cultural historian Andreas Pretzel wrote that "The Fantasy Echo of gay Nazis, which has been used for decades to marginalize and discredit homosexual persecution, has largely faded away. The implicit allegation of the collective guilt of the persecuted homosexuals has thus become part of the history of the reception of the Nazi homosexual persecution." In contrast, Siemens wrote in 2017 that "the cliché of the 'gay Nazi' is still firmly embedded in the cultural imagery of the Nazi movement".

=== Purpose ===
Wackerfuss argues that by "equating sexual deviance and political deviance", readers can "rest comfortably in a naïve belief that their societies, their social circles, and they themselves can never fall into fascist temptations". In his view, "the image of the gay Nazi therefore has very real consequences for modern politics" despite the rarity of actual gay Nazis. According to Stein, contemporary proponents of the gay-Nazi theory on the religious right have four main goals:

1. strip gays of their "victim" status to decrease public support for LGBTQ rights
2. drive a wedge between LGBTQ and Jewish voters, both traditionally progressive groups
3. create a parallel between conservative Christians and Jews
4. legitimize the idea that Christians are oppressed in the United States

== See also ==
- Timeline of LGBTQ history in Germany

== Sources ==
- Dillon, Christopher (2018). "Masculinity, Political Culture, and the Rise of Nazism". The Palgrave Handbook of Masculinity and Political Culture in Europe. Palgrave Macmillan UK. pp. 379–402. ISBN 978-1-137-58538-7.
- Göllnitz, Martin (2021). "Homophobie und Revolutionsangst. Die politische Dramaturgie des 30. Juni 1934" [Homophobia and fear of revolution. The political dramaturgy of June 30, 1934]. Revolution in Kiel – Revolutionsangst in der Geschichte [Revolution in Kiel – fear of revolution in history] (PDF). Kieler Schriften zur Regionalgeschichte: Band 8. Wachholtz Verlag. pp. 209–234.
- Haggerty, George (2013). Encyclopedia of Gay Histories and Cultures. Routledge. ISBN 978-1-135-58513-6.
- Hancock, Eleanor (1998). ""Only the Real, the True, the Masculine Held Its Value": Ernst Röhm, Masculinity, and Male Homosexuality". Journal of the History of Sexuality. 8 (4): 616–641. ISSN 1043-4070. JSTOR 3840412. PMID 11620476.
- Jensen, Erik N. (2002). "The Pink Triangle and Political Consciousness: Gays, Lesbians, and the Memory of Nazi Persecution". Journal of the History of Sexuality. 11 (1/2): 319–349. doi:10.1353/sex.2002.0008. S2CID 142580540.
- Jensen, Erik N. (2005). "The Pink Triangle and Political Consciousness; Gays, Lesbians, and the Memory of Nazi Persecution". In Herzog, Dagmar (ed.). Sexuality and German Fascism. Berghahn Books. ISBN 978-1-57181-551-4.
- Lingiardi, Vittorio (2002). Men in Love: Male Homosexualities from Ganymede to Batman. Open Court Publishing. ISBN 978-0-8126-9515-1.
- Marhoefer, Laurie (2015). Sex and the Weimar Republic: German Homosexual Emancipation and the Rise of the Nazis. Toronto: University of Toronto Press. ISBN 978-1-4426-1957-9.
- Oosterhuis, Harry (1995). "The "Jews" of the Antifascist Left". Journal of Homosexuality. 29 (2–3): 227–257. doi:10.1300/J082v29n02_09. PMID 8666756.
- Pretzel, Andreas (2014). "Schwule Nazis" [Gay Nazis]. In Schwartz, Michael (ed.). Homosexuelle im Nationalsozialismus: Neue Forschungsperspektiven zu Lebenssituationen von lesbischen, schwulen, bi-, trans- und intersexuellen Menschen 1933 bis 1945 [Homosexuals Under National Socialism: New Research Perspectives on the Life Circumstances of Lesbian, Gay, Bisexual, Transsexual, and Intersexual Persons from 1933 to 1945] (in German). De Gruyter Oldenbourg. pp. 69–76. doi:10.1524/9783486857504.69. ISBN 978-3-486-85750-4.
- Rabinbach, Anson (2008). "Staging Antifascism: "The Brown Book of the Reichstag Fire and Hitler Terror"". New German Critique. 35 (103): 97–126. doi:10.1215/0094033X-2007-021. ISSN 0094-033X. JSTOR 27669222.
- Schwartz, Michael (2019). Homosexuelle, Seilschaften, Verrat: Ein transnationales Stereotyp im 20. Jahrhundert [Homosexuals, Political Cliques, and Betrayal: A 20th Century Transnational Stereotype] (in German). De Gruyter. ISBN 978-3-11-063650-5.
- Siemens, Daniel (2017). Stormtroopers: A New History of Hitler's Brownshirts. Yale University Press. ISBN 978-0-300-23125-0.
- Spotts, Frederic (2016). Cursed Legacy: The Tragic Life of Klaus Mann. Yale University Press. ISBN 978-0-300-22097-1.
- Stein, Arlene (2016). "Whose Memories? Whose Victimhood? Contests for the Holocaust Frame in Recent Social Movement Discourse". Sociological Perspectives. 41 (3): 519–540. doi:10.2307/1389562. JSTOR 1389562. S2CID 147317075.
- Tamagne, Florence (2007). A History of Homosexuality in Europe, Vol. I & II: Berlin, London, Paris 1919-1939. Algora Publishing. ISBN 978-0-87586-357-3.
- Wackerfuss, Andrew (2015). Stormtrooper Families: Homosexuality and Community in the Early Nazi Movement. New York: Harrington Park Press. ISBN 978-1-939594-06-8.
- Whisnant, Clayton J. (2016). Queer Identities and Politics in Germany: A History, 1880–1945. Columbia University Press. ISBN 978-1-939594-10-5.
- Woods, Gregory (1998). A History of Gay Literature: The Male Tradition. New Haven: Yale University Press. ISBN 978-0-300-08088-9.
- zur Nieden, Susanne (2005). "Aufstieg und Fall des virilen Männerhelden. Der Skandal um Ernst Röhm und seine Ermordung" [The rise and fall of the virile male hero. The Ernst Röhm scandal and his murder]. Homosexualität und Staatsräson. Männlichkeit, Homophobie und Politik in Deutschland 1900–1945 [Homosexuality and raison d'état. Masculinity, homophobia and politics in Germany 1900–1945] (in German). Campus Verlag. pp. 147−192. ISBN 978-3-593-37749-0.
