= The Pink Swastika =

1995 book by Scott Lively and Kevin Abrams

The Pink Swastika: Homosexuality in the Nazi Party
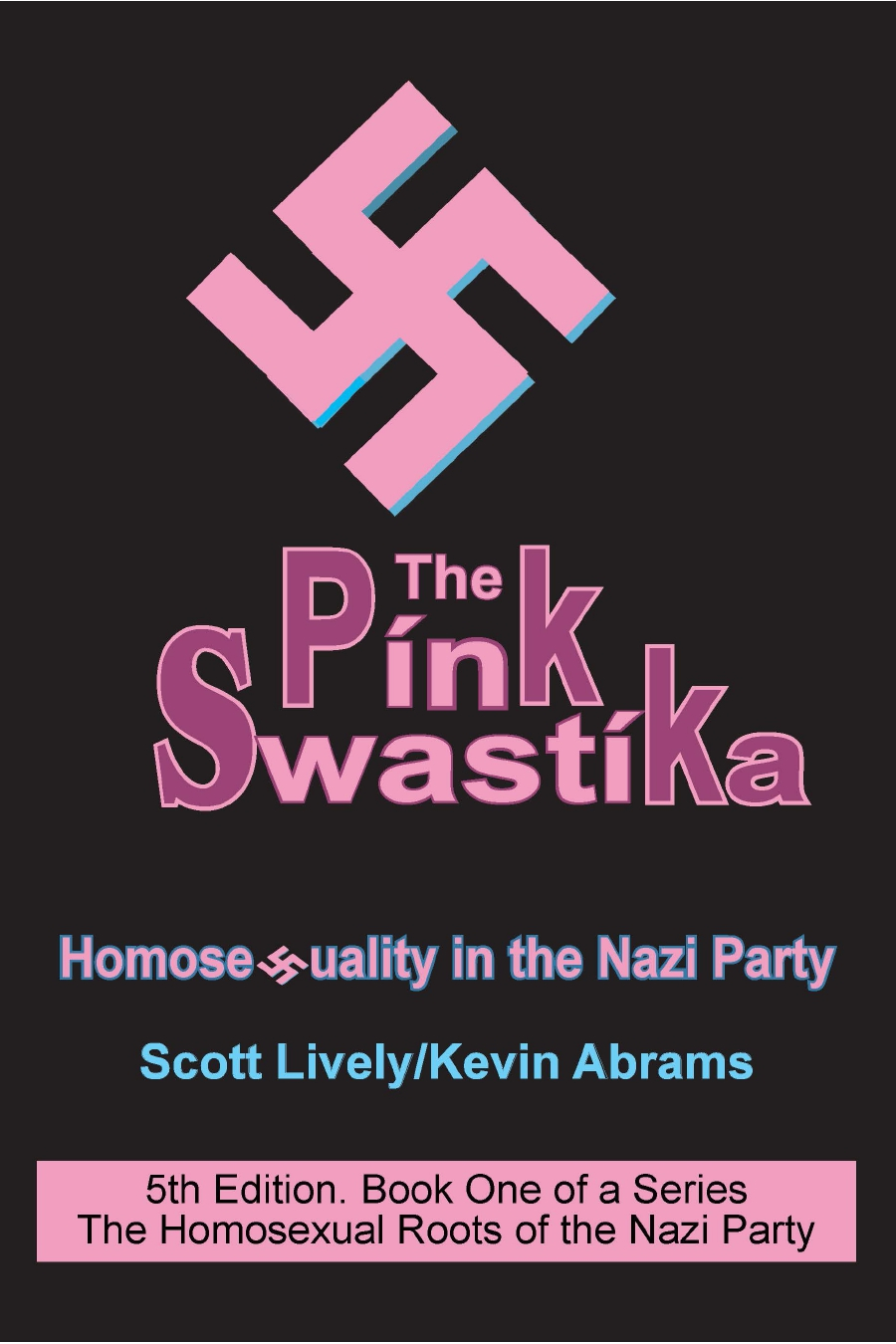
- Cover of the fifth edition
- Authors: Scott Lively; Kevin Abrams
- Language: English
- Subject: Nazi Germany
- Published: 1995
- Publisher: Founders Publishing Corporation
- Publication place: United States
- Media type: Print (paperback)
- ISBN: 978-0-9647609-0-5
- LC Class: DD256.5 .L55

The Pink Swastika: Homosexuality in the Nazi Party is a 1995 pseudohistorical book by Scott Lively and Kevin Abrams. Drawing on Samuel Igra's 1945 book Germany's National Vice, Lively and Abrams argue that the crimes committed by homosexuals in the Nazi Party exceed the persecution of homosexuals in Nazi Germany and that homosexuality contributed to the extreme militarism of Nazi Germany. They contend that only feminine homosexuals were persecuted by the Nazis, while "butch" homosexuals formed the leadership cadre of the Nazi party. Historian Andrew Wackerfuss criticized the book for lack of accuracy and "outright homophobic charges". The claim advanced by Igra, Lively, and Abrams that homosexuals were responsible for Nazi atrocities is rejected by most historians.

== Background ==
The authors of the book are Kevin Abrams, and Scott Lively, an American right-wing activist who worked for Oregon Citizens Alliance (loosely affiliated with the Christian Coalition of America) and Abiding Truth Ministries. Lively is best known for his international anti-gay activism; he campaigned for the Russian gay propaganda law and his 2009 tour in Uganda was one of the motives for Uganda's so-called "Kill the Gays" bill. The book was published after Measure 9, an unsuccessful Oregon ballot measure to repeal gay rights.

The book was first published in 1995 by Founders Publishing Corporation. In 2017, the authors released the fifth edition, published by Veritas Aeterna Press. They state that their motivation for writing the book is to respond to the "myth of the 'pink triangle'" and the "gay political agenda". One significant source for The Pink Swastika was Samuel Igra's Germany's National Vice (1945). Among other things, Igra claimed that "there is a causal connection between mass sexual perversion" and German war crimes during both world wars. The book attempts to synthesize Igra's allegations that German militarism had a homoerotic foundation with the Nazi occult theories popularized by American author Dusty Sklar in her book, The Nazis and the Occult (1977). The claim advanced by Igra, Lively, and Abrams that homosexuals were responsible for Nazi atrocities has been frequently asserted, but is rejected by most historians.

== Content ==
In The Pink Swastika, Abrams and Lively argue that homosexuals were the "true inventors of Nazism and the guiding force behind many Nazi atrocities" and that "there was far more brutality, rape, torture and murder committed against innocent people by Nazi deviants and homosexuals than there ever was against homosexuals." The authors claim that only "femme" homosexuals were persecuted, and even they did not fare as badly as other Nazi victims, while "butch" homosexuals—including Adolf Hitler, Joseph Goebbels, Hermann Goering, Heinrich Himmler, and Rudolf Hess—formed the core leadership of the Nazi regime. They claim that leaders of the Wandervogel scouting movement "recruited countless young men into the homosexual lifestyle" and that the Sturmabteilung (SA)—the Nazi party's original paramilitary wing—also engaged in homosexual recruitment. Chapters of the book address issues such as Magnus Hirschfeld and his Institut für Sexualwissenschaft, Adolf Brand, the Freikorps, Baldur von Schirach and the Hitler Youth, and the Röhm scandal surrounding the SA leader Ernst Röhm.

== Reception ==
In his book Stormtrooper Families about homosexuality in the Sturmabteilung, American historian Andrew Wackerfuss described the authors as "a pair of anti-gay political activists" who "tried to rebrand the brown shirt as a pink swastika". He situates the book within 1990's culture wars in the United States and noted that Lively's allegations of "gay fascism" have gained "wide popularity on the American right" as well as in Russia and Uganda. Wackerfuss considers that there are "numerous and persuasive criticisms of [Lively and Abrams'] misuse of the historical method". He criticized The Pink Swastika's "outright homophobic charges" and recommended The Annotated Pink Swastika (an internet publication of the Citizens Allied for Civic Action) as "a useful guide to the errors and inaccuracies ... the text is deconstructed page by page to reveal its many flaws". German historian Martin Göllnitz called the book's argument "completely untenable" because it relies on fabrications like the claim that Röhm's SA was the product of the Weimar homosexual movement.

Sociologist Arlene Stein states that The Pink Swastika "is a carefully constructed piece of political rhetoric, mixing serious scholarship with lies and outright distortions, truths with half-truths and falsehoods". According to Stein, the book is part of an effort to strip gays of their "victim" status in order to decrease support for LGBT rights. Writing in Journal of the History of Sexuality, historian Erik Jensen regards the authors' linkage of homosexuality and Nazism as the recurrence of a "pernicious myth", originating in 1930s attacks on Nazism by socialists and communists and which has been "long since dispelled" by "serious scholarship". According to Fordham University's Internet History Sourcebook on the Holocaust, "no serious historian takes the Lively/Abrams book seriously as anything other than evidence about the modern American far right".

Lively said that the book "indirectly forc[ed] the 'gays' to abandon the pink triangle as the primary symbol of their movement" and replace it with the rainbow flag. In fact, the rainbow flag has been in use since 1978. The book has been promoted by some conservative Christian groups and conversion therapy advocates. For example, a representative of the Family Defense Council claimed that The Pink Swastika was "a thoroughly researched, eminently readable, demolition of the 'gay' myth, symbolized by the pink triangle, that the Nazis were anti-homosexual." Right-wing website World Net Daily also promoted The Pink Swastika, stating that it "makes the case that the Nazi Party is best understood as a neo-pagan, homosexual cult". The Southern Poverty Law Center asserts that the book's historical negationism—pseudohistory which denies documented facts—is comparable to Holocaust denial.

== See also ==
- The Hidden Hitler
- Gay Nazis myth
