= Judith Reisman =

American conservative author (1935–2021)

Judith Ann Reisman (/ˈriːsmən/; April 11, 1935 – April 9, 2021) was an American conservative author, best known for her criticism and condemnation of the work and legacy of Alfred Kinsey. She has been referred to as the "founder of the modern anti-Kinsey movement". During her career, Reisman occasionally served as a consultant to the U.S. Departments of Justice, Education, and Health and Human Services. She held a doctorate in communications from Case Western Reserve University, and was a visiting professor of law at Liberty University.

== Advocating for children ==
Writing for AlterNet, blogger Max Blumenthal wrote about how Reisman's daughter's molestation set Reisman on the path of researching Kinsey's activities. Purportedly, an investigation indicated a link between the assailant's viewing of a pornographic magazine and the 13-year-old girl's assault (noted in Reisman's memorial page). Following the sexual assault, the accused boy and his family slipped out of the country, while her daughter lapsed into a deep depression. Fifteen years later, the daughter died from a brain aneurysm, which Reisman suspected was linked to the earlier trauma.

Reisman was one of the founding members of the Reisman Institute, and served as its president until 2021. She delivered talks on child advocacy, and was the director of the Liberty Child Protection Center. She received the "Protector of Children" award from Citizens for Families in 2005, as well as the "Save Our Children Scientist Of The Year For 1993" from the Save Our Children National Alliance. She was nominated by the Inspector General for the Department of Defense to be part of the panel reviewing sexual misconduct for the US Air Force Academy in 2003.

=== Children in the Kinsey reports ===
Over the following years, her accusations against Kinsey became increasingly serious. She said that he was a fraud who had employed and relied on pedophiles for his research, and claimed that Kinsey himself had sexually abused children. This allegation drew a response from Kinsey biographer James H. Jones, who wrote that unless new evidence to the contrary becomes available, Reisman's claims that Kinsey may have witnessed or personally participated in child molestation under the guise of scientific research should be considered groundless.

Due to such ideas, she was "ostracized by mainstream academia".

Prior to the release of the 2004 film Kinsey, Reisman and Laura Schlessinger attempted to place an advertisement "alleging Kinsey was a pervert and a pedophile".

The Southern Poverty Law Center has described Reisman as a "conspiracy theorist" and a promoter of "sexual pseudoscience" in regard to her views on Kinsey. John Bancroft, director of The Kinsey Institute, stated:

Reisman's campaign against Kinsey was described by Morton Hunt (1999) as follows: "To use smear tactics, methods of intimidation, and political trickery to achieve what one considers a moral end, is to live by the principle that the end justifies the means." (P. 209.)

Diederik F. Janssen has reviewed her book Sexual Sabotage: How One Mad Scientist Unleashed a Plague of Corruption and Contagion on America from a postmodern perspective. First, the observer says of her book: "This takes the unseemly shape of a paranoid sermon on American decency held together by acerbic ad hominems, a tapestry of slippery slope arguments, a string of unwholesome linkages ('Nazi serial pedophiles'), and a litany of medieval, Victorian, and McCarthyian diagnostics ('plague,' 'sexual psychopaths,' 'sexual deviancy,' 'perversions')." Then he considers that Reisman plays truth games precisely because Kinsey had invited sexologists to play truth games. Janssen sees her fault in "exactly the scientific cover-up of moral dilemmas she accuses her nemesis Kinsey of. To maximize this argument: what needs criticism, on behalf of children, is scientism, not moralism." He notes that if taboos need "scientific (medical) approval, their days may be numbered."

Reisman lambasted SCOTUS for trusting Kinsey's legacy (sexology): "[...] on June 26, 2003, the U.S. Supreme Court enshrined Kinsey's fraudulent data as the revolutionary moral law of our land [...] a duplicitous sexual deviant was the primary source used by the United States Supreme Court as their 'science' authority in Lawrence v. Texas."

About gay marriage she wrote to SCOTUS: "this Court should not permit the institution of marriage to become the latest victim of the Kinseyan model of American society." She also wrote to the Court that mainstream sexology is "an ideology built upon the sexual abuse of infants and children, and the libeling of the 'Greatest Generation'."

Selective quotation, exaggeration, and outright lies are time-honored tactics of the Right. Judith Reisman has long circulated the calumny that Alfred Kinsey conducted sexual experiments on infants at his institute; she offers no substantiation.

— Judith Levine

Reisman's book Kinsey: Crimes and Consequences; The Red Queen and the Grand Scheme was called "wildly irresponsible and baffling book... Nonetheless, it contains some interesting information about the reaction to Kinsey."

It defies logic and common sense to think that the officials at Indiana University, the Rockefeller Foundation, and the National Research Council, who supported and funded his research, and the thousands of scholars around the world who have scrutinized the Kinsey reports for the past forty years, have all missed the shocking evidence of fraud, perversion and homosexual/ pedophile conspiracy Reisman and Eichel charge Kinsey with. Respectable scholars and scientists would prefer to ignore these absurd charges. (Francoeur 119

Vern L. Bullough accused Reisman and Eichel of faking their evidence against Kinsey.

==== Litigation against the Kinsey Institute ====
In 1991, Reisman, with an attorney from the Rutherford Institute, sued the Kinsey Institute, its then director June Reinisch, and Indiana University, for defamation as well as intentional and negligent infliction of emotional distress regarding alleged attempts to censor her book Kinsey, Sex and Fraud. The case was ultimately dismissed with prejudice in 1994.

=== Images of children, crime and violence ===
In 1983, the United States Department of Justice (DOJ) was headed by social conservatives, including Alfred S. Regnery in the Office of Juvenile Justice and Delinquency Prevention (OJJDP). Reisman had given a talk on a Washington, D.C. radio program and on CNN's Crossfire about the "connections between sex education, sex educators, and the pornography industry" which was heard by a member of the DOJ, and Reisman was asked to discuss her views in person, which "struck a common chord ... especially those opposed to sex education in the schools." She was then invited to apply for a grant, which was approved without competition for the amount of $798,531 (though later reduced to $734,371), to undertake a "study at American University to determine whether Playboy, Hustler and other more explicit materials are linked to violence by juveniles." The allocation came under criticism as the grant was approved despite a staff memo from Pamela Swain, a director of research, evaluation and program development, in which she claimed that the study could be accomplished for $60,000.

By 1986, Reisman concluded her investigation of "372 issues of Playboy, 184 issues of Penthouse and 125 issues of Hustler" that found "2,016 cartoons that included children apparently under the age of 17 and 3,988 other pictures, photographs and drawings that depict infants or youths," the details of which were collected into "a three-volume report running to 1,600 pages" titled "Images of Children, Crime and Violence in Playboy, Penthouse, and Hustler." The report drew contemporary criticism in regards to its cost and quality. Sex crime researcher Avedon Carol commented that the report was a "scientific disaster, riddled with researcher bias and baseless assumptions." The American University (AU), where Reisman's study had been academically based, refused to publish the completed work, citing concerns by an independent academic auditor. Criminologist Robert Figlio of the University of Pennsylvania stated "The term child used in the aggregate sense in this report is so inclusive and general as to be meaningless." Loretta Haroian stated about the report "vigilantism: paranoid, pseudoscientific hyperbole with a thinly veiled, hidden agenda." Carol stated "even the Reagan moralists were embarrassed by her. Yet some feminists persist in citing her as an authority on the harm of pornography."

Author Susan Trento chronicled additional complexities surrounding the episode. Initially, Reisman was targeted by some as a proxy to attack Regnery. The nature of Reisman's grant work and the concurrent Attorney General's Commission on Pornography, which would author the Meese Report in 1986, caused anxiety in the pornography industry. Fears began to come to fruition when 7-Eleven stores stopped selling Playboy and Penthouse, in part citing Reisman's work. Trento writes that the public relations firm headed by Robert Keith Gray was hired by Playboy and Penthouse "to discredit Meese's Pornography Commission" specifically as well as others that threatened their business, presumably including Reisman. "Whatever the merits of her research," Trento wrote, when support from the OJJDP was needed most, its leadership backed away from Reisman leaving her project to fail and leaving Reisman feeling "bitter" and "helpless" after "spending years developing an expertise and doing what she thought was an excellent job in the public interest."

In 2017, Reisman became involved in a group called Investigating YouTube. Specifically, she voiced her concern about the disturbing content in YouTube videos targeted at children, involving suggestive imagery and violence while using popular children's figures such as Frozen's Elsa and Spider-Man.

=== Sources of child sexual abuse ===
When Playboy and Penthouse printed nude photos of Madonna in 1985, Reisman warned that because of the entertainer's idolization by youth, their publication would destigmatize and "encourage voluntary display by youngsters," leading to an increase in child pornography.

=== Allegations of homosexual recruitment of children ===
Reisman claimed that homosexuals employ recruitment techniques that rival those of the United States Marine Corps. Reisman cited "a clear avenue for the recruitment of children" by homosexuals in her public support of Oregon Ballot Measure 9 (1992).

== Erototoxins ==
Reisman postulated a physical mechanism to account for the dangers she ascribed to pornography: when viewed, an addictive mixture of chemicals (such as glucose) which she dubbed "erototoxins", floods the brain, causing harmful influences to it. Reisman hoped that MRI studies would prove porn-induced physical brain damage and predicted lawsuits against publishers and distributors of pornography similar to those against Big Tobacco, which resulted in the Tobacco Master Settlement Agreement. Further, if pornography can "subvert cognition", then "these toxic media should be legally outlawed, as is all other toxic waste, and eliminated from our societal structure." Finally, individuals who have suffered brain damage from "pornography are no longer expressing 'free speech' and, for their own good, shouldn't be protected under the First Amendment."

The 2002–2011 Proceedings of the American Academy of Forensic Sciences state about her public statements about erototoxins: "facts stood in the way of her opinion and testimony."

Even at the testimonies before the US Congress in 2004, it was apparent that the opinions about erototoxins were divided, critics citing lack of evidence for the existence of eroto-toxins.

The latest entry into the sex addiction/brain chemistry sweepstakes is the new junk science of "porn addiction." One primary proponent, Judith Reisman (who also claims that Alfred Kinsey was a pedophilic fraud), refers to poisonous "erototoxins" released into the bloodstream during the viewing of pornographic material. Another proponent, Marnia Robinson, claims that teens' brains are so plastic that boys easily become addicted to porn, which then damages their ability to function sexually with actual partners. Not a shred of evidence clouds Reisman's or Robinson's judgment about how people become addicted to their own body chemicals when those chemicals are related to sex rather than, say, a walk through the park or a production of King Lear.

— Marty Klein (2012)

== Homosexuals and Nazism ==
Reisman said that she believed that a homosexual movement in Germany gave rise to the Nazi Party and the Holocaust. She endorsed The Pink Swastika, a 1995 pseudohistorical book which expressed this view, and compared modern youth groups for homosexuals to the Hitler Youth. She equated Kinsey's participation in the Boy Scouts with participation in the Hitler Youth.

== Mapplethorpe exhibition obscenity trial ==
In 1990, Dennis Barrie, then director of the Contemporary Arts Center in Cincinnati, was accused of obscenity for displaying controversial photographs by Robert Mapplethorpe; Reisman was called as the only expert witness for the prosecution. In the previous year, Reisman had authored an editorial in The Washington Times entitled "Promoting Child Abuse as Art" which "accused Mapplethorpe of being both a Nazi and a child molester". The defense argued that she was not qualified as an art expert, but the judge allowed her to testify as a rebuttal witness. Among her credentials as a media specialist she listed: "preparation of educational videotapes and slide presentations for the Smithsonian Institution as well as having worked for Scholastic magazine, created audio-visual segments for television's Captain Kangaroo show, and did research for Attorney General Edwin Meese's commission on pornography and for the conservative American Family Association." During her testimony, Reisman did not discuss the sexually explicit content of Mapplethorpe's work, arguing instead that the five photographs were not works of art because they either did not display a human face, or, in the case of Self-Portrait, the face "... displayed no discernible emotion" and absent emotion, the placement of the photographs in a museum implied that the activities displayed were appropriate. During cross-examination by the defense on her views of homosexuality, Reisman testified that "anal sodomy is traumatically dysfunctional and is definitely associated with AIDS." She also claimed that the pictures of nude children legitimized pedophilia. The defense emphasized that Reisman's experience with art was limited to her work as a songwriter.

Barrie and the center were acquitted of all charges by the jury.

== Personal life ==
Reisman was the daughter of Mathew L. Gelernter and Ada née Goldberg. She married Arnold Reisman in 1955 in Los Angeles. Her family was Jewish. She died on April 9, 2021.

=== Obituaries ===
PinkNews reported on Reisman's death, describing her as an anti-LGBT+ author of bizarre research papers. The obituary noted her claims that gay people caused the rise of the Nazi Party, her assertions that allowing gay members or staff within the Boy Scouts of America would lead to sexual predation, and her contributions towards upholding anti-sodomy laws in Jamaica.

She received praise from the John Birch Society, which stated "[...] Judith Reisman repeatedly, over the past several decades, strode into many hostile enemy camps around the world — colleges, universities, legislative bodies, media outlets — to speak truth to power and to expose vile works of darkness."

Robert Knight said in The Washington Times that "she was cast as a careless, right-wing fanatic", was scorned even by "conservatives who were afraid of guilt by association", and that she had converted to Christianity.

== Bibliography ==
- Kinsey, Sex and Fraud: The Indoctrination of a People. Judith Reisman et al.; Huntington House; Lafayette, LA (1990) ISBN 978-0-910311-20-5
- "Soft Porn" Plays Hardball: Its Tragic Effects on Women, Children and the Family. Huntington House; Lafayette, LA (1991) ISBN 978-0-910311-92-2
- Kinsey: Crimes & Consequences: The Red Queen and the Grand Scheme. The Institute for Media Education; Crestwood, KY (1998) ISBN 978-0-9666624-1-2
- Kinsey's Attic: The Shocking Story of How One Man's Sexual Pathology Changed the World. Cumberland House Publishing (2006) ISBN 978-1-58182-460-5
- Sexual Sabotage: How One Mad Scientist Unleashed a Plague of Corruption and Contagion on America. WND Books (2010) ISBN 978-1-935071-85-3
- Her commentaries were featured in Salvo.
- Some of Reisman's research can be found at Research Gate.
- Francoeur, Robert T. (1992, July). Kinsey forty years later part I: attacks on Kinsey. Penthouse forum. 48+.
- Francoeur, Robert T. (1992, August). Kinsey forty years later part II: the need to update. Penthouse forum. 48-53.
- Francoeur, Robert T. (1992, September). Kinsey forty years later part III: prude with a purpose. Penthouse forum. 48-52.
