= Röhm scandal =

1931–32 political scandal in Germany

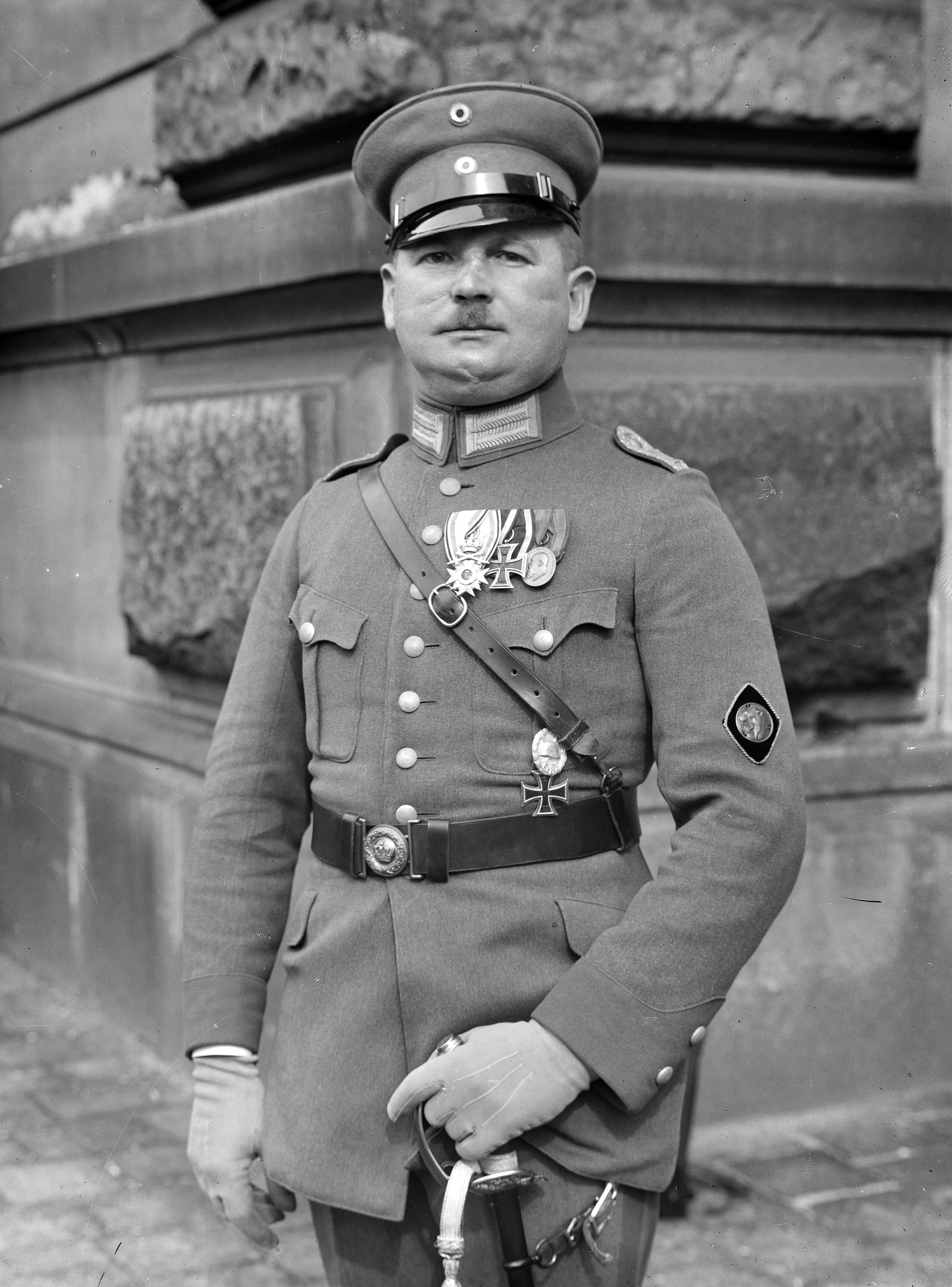
Ernst Röhm in 1924

The Röhm scandal resulted from the public disclosure of Nazi politician Ernst Röhm's homosexuality by anti-Nazis in 1931 and 1932.

Röhm was an early member of the Nazi Party and was close to party leader Adolf Hitler. In the late 1920s, he lived in Bolivia where he wrote letters to a friend, Karl-Günther Heimsoth, in which he candidly discussed his sexual orientation. Röhm's double life began to fall apart when he returned to Germany in 1930 and was appointed leader of the Sturmabteilung (SA), the Nazi Party's original paramilitary wing. Although the Social Democratic Party of Germany (SPD) and the Communist Party of Germany (KPD) supported the repeal of Paragraph 175, the German law criminalizing homosexuality, both parties utilized homophobia to attack their Nazi opponents and inaccurately portrayed the Nazi Party as dominated by homosexuals. Their goal was to prevent or delay the Nazi seizure of power, which ultimately occurred in early 1933.

Beginning in April 1931, the SPD newspaper Münchener Post published a series of front-page stories about alleged homosexuality in the SA, which turned out to be based on forgeries. SPD leaders set out to obtain authentic evidence of Röhm's sexuality and, if possible, convict him under Paragraph 175. Röhm was tried five times, but never convicted. During the German presidential election in March 1932, the SPD released a pamphlet edited by ex-Nazi Helmuth Klotz with Röhm's letters to Heimsoth. This second round of disclosures sparked a plot by some Nazis to murder Röhm, which fell through and resulted in additional negative press for the party.

The scandal came to national attention as a result of the beating of Klotz by Nazi deputies in the Reichstag building on 12 May 1932 as revenge for his publication of Röhm's letters. Many Germans saw this attack on democracy as more important than Röhm's personal life. The Nazis' electoral performance was not affected by the scandal, but it affected their ability to present themselves as the party of moral renewal. Hitler defended Röhm during the scandal. The latter became completely dependent on Hitler due to loss of support in the Nazi Party. Hitler had Röhm and his friends murdered in 1934, citing both his homosexuality and alleged treachery. After the purge, the Nazi government systematically persecuted homosexual men.

== Background ==
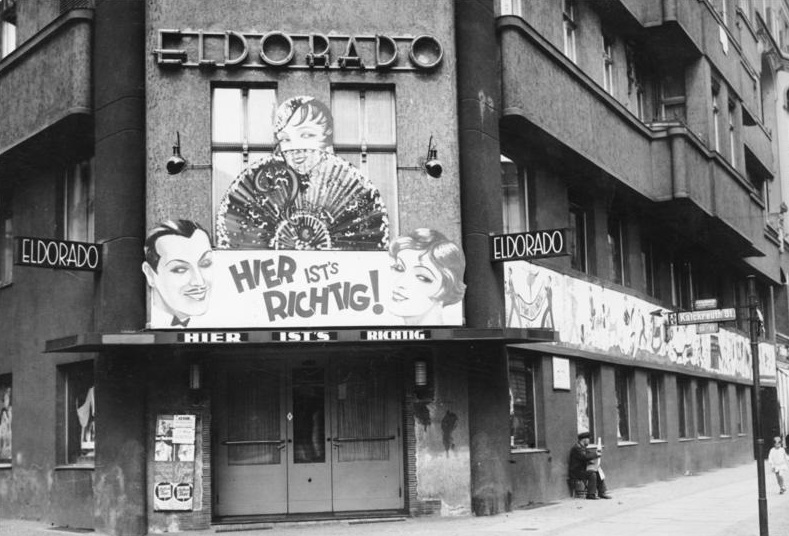
Eldorado (pictured in 1932), the most famous gay establishment in Germany, frequented by Röhm

Ernst Röhm (1887–1934) was one of the early leaders of the Nazi Party and built up its paramilitary wing, the Sturmabteilung (SA), which violently attacked communists and other perceived enemies of the German people. He was a friend of future German dictator Adolf Hitler and in 1923 he was convicted of treason for his role in the Beer Hall Putsch. After he was elected to the Reichstag and went to live in Berlin in 1924, he frequented homosexual establishments, including the Eldorado club. In 1929, Röhm joined the homosexual association Bund für Menschenrecht (League for Human Rights) and became known to many figures in Berlin's homosexual community. Röhm resented having to conceal his sexual orientation and was as open about it as it was possible to be without stating it. In 1925, a man he had hired as a prostitute robbed him; Röhm reported the man to the police. Although Hitler found out about this incident, he did not take action.

=== Röhm–Heimsoth letters ===
In 1928, the homosexual, nationalist physician Karl-Günther Heimsoth wrote a letter to Röhm questioning a passage in the latter's autobiography, Die Geschichte eines Hochverräters ("The Story of an Arch-Traitor"). As part of a denunciation of conservative, bourgeois morality, Röhm had written, "The struggle against the cant, deceit and hypocrisy of today's society must take its starting point from the innate nature of the drives that are placed in men from the cradle … If the struggle in this area is successful, then the masks can be torn from the dissimilation in all areas of the human social and legal order". He blamed bourgeois morality for causing suicide. Röhm's arguments about morality found little support among other Nazis.

Heimsoth asked if Röhm intended this passage as a criticism of Paragraph 175, the German law prohibiting sex between men. Röhm replied, stating "You have understood me completely!" He told Heimsoth that he had initially intended to be more explicit, but toned the passage down on the advice of friends. Röhm and Heimsoth befriended each other and spent time together at homosexual meeting places in Berlin. They corresponded while Röhm was in Bolivia, where he had emigrated in 1928 to work as a military advisor. Both men saw their homosexuality as compatible with Nazism; Heimsoth hoped that Röhm could lead the Nazi Party to become accepting of homosexuality. In his letters, Röhm discussed his sexual orientation in unambiguous language, once describing himself as "same-sex orientated" (gleichgeschlechtlich) and saying he had an aversion to women.

=== Political views of homosexuality ===
In 1928, the Nazi Party responded negatively to a questionnaire about their view of Paragraph 175, and declared "Anyone who even thinks of homosexual love is our enemy". Nazi politicians regularly railed against homosexuality, claiming that it was a Jewish conspiracy to undermine the German people. They promised to have homosexuals sterilized if they took power. The majority of Nazis held traditional moral beliefs and found Röhm and his associates, some of whom were homosexual, intolerable. At this time any civil servant or officer whose homosexuality was discovered would have been dismissed, regardless of whether a violation of Paragraph 175 could be proven. The SA's tacit tolerance of homosexuals in its own ranks was in contrast to this. This tolerance was dependent on remaining discreet and certainly not publicly known, lest it bring the SA's hypermasculine image into question. Röhm tried to separate his private and political life, but historian Laurie Marhoefer writes that "most Nazis considered supposedly private matters like sexuality intensely public and political". Biographer Eleanor Hancock comments, "If Ernst Röhm was at all revolutionary, he was revolutionary in his demand that National Socialism and German society accept him as he was—a man who desired other men".

The Social Democratic Party of Germany (SPD) and Communist Party of Germany (KPD) were the primary supporters of repealing Paragraph 175, but they opportunistically used accusations of homosexuality against political opponents. Contemporaries noted the hypocrisy of this approach. Confronted with the rise of Nazism, they exploited a stereotype associating homosexuality with militarism that had been established during the Eulenburg affair. In 1927, SPD deputies heckled Nazi deputy Wilhelm Frick, shouting "Hitler, heil, heil, heil. Heil Eulenburg!" after Frick called for harsh penalties for homosexuality. The SPD initiated the Röhm scandal in an effort to prevent or delay the Nazi seizure of power at a time when the defenders of the Weimar Republic's democracy sensed that they were running out of options.

== Development of the scandal ==
=== Röhm's return to Germany ===
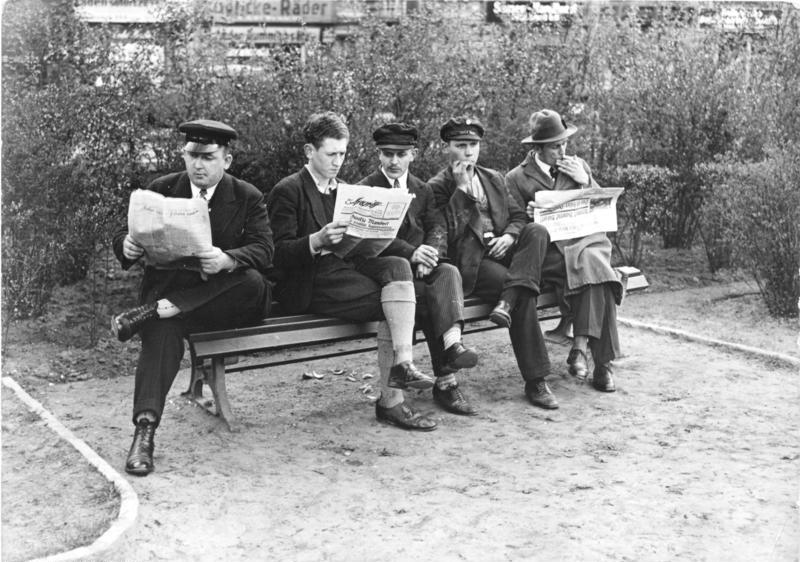
"Unemployed SA men" in Tiergarten, Berlin, 1932

Röhm returned to Germany at Hitler's request in November 1930, and was officially appointed chief of staff of the SA on 5 January 1931. This appointment was seen by many as the second most powerful office in the Nazi movement, but Röhm's position was weakened by his homosexuality and he was dependent on Hitler's personal support. His predecessor, Franz von Pfeffer, wrote that Röhm had been appointed "probably, also because of his inclinations ... [which] offered a useful point of attack at any time".

Röhm's appointment was opposed from the beginning by some in the SA who saw it as cementing the subordination of the SA to the Nazi Party's political wing. His homosexuality was seized upon by those who disagreed with the organizational reforms but could not openly criticize Hitler without breaking with Nazism, because of the Führer principle. Hitler said that the personal life of a Nazi was only a concern for the party if it contradicted the fundamental principles of Nazism. The leader of the Berlin SA, Walther Stennes, rebelled against the SA leadership and declared that he and his followers would "never serve under a notorious homosexual like Röhm and his Pupenjungen (male prostitutes)". On 3 February, Hitler dismissed Stennes's objection, stating, "The SA is not a girls' boarding school". Röhm's appointment of old friends to powerful positions in the SA aroused the ire of his opponents, but contrary to popular perceptions, not all these men were homosexual and they were appointed due to perceived loyalty rather than sexuality.

The internal opposition to Röhm intensified in February 1931 when Hitler replaced Stennes with Paul Schulz, who promoted two suspected homosexuals, Edmund Heines and Karl Ernst, within the Berlin SA. Rumor had it that Ernst was only promoted because of an intimate relationship with Paul Röhrbein, a friend of Röhm's who was not a member of the party or SA. Many Berlin SA personnel disagreed with these appointments, complaining about the "Röhm-Röhrbein-Ernst Triple Alliance", which was perceived as a homosexual clique. It was incorrectly claimed by Röhm's opponents that "large circles of Berlin party comrades are informed about the gay clubs", and these rivals noted with satisfaction that the perceived homosexual cliques were exposed in the left-wing media. On the night of 26 June, a Nazi named Walter Bergmann was arrested at a Berlin pub where he had found Ernst and Röhrbein together. Bergmann shouted, "Look at these parasites on the party, these Pupenjungen, these damned ass-fuckers who let the party's reputation go to hell". Although Röhm asserted in one of his letters to Heimsoth that the party had become "accustomed to my criminal idiosyncrasy", Marhoefer concludes that this "was wild optimism or self-delusion".

Röhm's double life became unsustainable in the face of his higher profile and the rising popularity of the Nazi Party. He became more circumspect than before, avoiding homosexual clubs. His friend Peter Granninger procured young men between 16 and 20 years old and brought them to apartments owned by himself and Karl Leon Du Moulin-Eckart for sexual encounters. When an unemployed waiter in Munich, Fritz Reif, tried to blackmail him in April 1931, it was reported in the press. By the beginning of 1931, newspapers started to allude to his homosexuality, leading Nazi propagandist Joseph Goebbels to write in his diary on 27 February that the Nazi Party was seen as "the Eldorado of the 175-ers".

=== The 1931 press campaign ===
On 14 April 1931, the SPD newspaper Münchener Post began reporting a series of front-page stories on the "hair-raising depravity in the Section 175 sense" that it argued was rampant in the Nazi Party. The first story claimed that Röhm and Heines were part of a homosexual clique in the SA and that they walked arm-in-arm with Hitler, citing an unnamed former Nazi (possibly Otto Strasser). The second article, published on 23 April, reported on Röhm's dalliances with a male prostitute. The third accused the Nazis of hypocrisy for condemning homosexuality in public but turning a blind eye to homosexuals in its own ranks, reporting that Hitler had ignored various reports of Röhm's homosexuality. The Münchener Post claimed without evidence that German youth were endangered by Röhm's homosexuality and coined the word Röhmisch to describe the alleged moral dissolution of the SA. Other SPD and KPD newspapers repeated the reports.

One of the main sources for the stories were alleged letters between Röhm and the former Nazi Eduard Meyer. Röhm wrote in the Nazi newspaper Völkischer Beobachter that Meyer's letters were forged and sued the Münchener Post for libel. The investigation confirmed that Meyer had forged the letters; Meyer was arrested for forgery and killed himself in prison before the trial could begin. Coverage of the scandal in the left-wing media diminished, but the rumors persisted. Röhm's homosexuality was cited as part of a broader pattern in which it was argued that the Nazis did not "possess the moral qualities" requisite for leadership. In September 1931 the SPD's Hamburger Echo brought up "the gay (schwul) captain Röhm" in response to a Nazi political poster calling for "a clean Germany, a true family life".

=== Trials against Röhm, 1931–1932 ===
Observing the Meyer debacle, SPD leaders decided to find authentic evidence of Röhm's homosexuality to charge him under Paragraph 175. The Berlin police, under the jurisdiction of Prussian interior minister Carl Severing (SPD), often declined to enforce this law but opened an investigation against Röhm based on the testimony of waiter Fritz Reif. The police confiscated the letters between Röhm and Heimsoth and interrogated both men. Under interrogation, Röhm admitted to bisexuality and said that he had masturbated with other men, but never violated Paragraph 175. On 6 June 1931, a trial against Röhm opened. Reif testified that he and a friend, hotel employee Peter Kronninger, had participated in mutual masturbation with Röhm in late 1930 in a hotel room. Reif said that when he did not receive the money he was promised, he ended up going to the police. Röhm and Kronninger denied the incident. The trial was eventually dropped for lack of evidence. In all, Röhm was unsuccessfully tried five times in 1931 and 1932, but the prosecution was never able to prove that he had violated Paragraph 175. It was especially difficult to obtain evidence for a crime committed in private.

=== Helmuth Klotz's pamphlet (March 1932) ===
The SPD decided to publish the Röhm–Heimsoth letters during the 1932 German presidential election in which Hitler was running against incumbent Paul Hindenburg. The former Nazi turned anti-fascist publicist Helmuth Klotz prepared a 17-page pamphlet titled Der Fall Röhm (The Röhm Case) that contained facsimiles of three letters. In early March 1932, the SPD printed and mailed 300,000 copies of the pamphlet to important Germans including politicians, army officers, doctors, teachers, and notaries. In the pamphlet, Klotz argued: "This fish stinks from its head. Decay reaches deep into the ranks of the NSDAP" (Nazi Party). He asserted that a party that tolerated homosexuality in its highest echelons must intend to "poison the Volk [,] … destroy [its] moral strength" and would lead to the decline of Germany similar to the decline of ancient Rome. Klotz claimed that leaving Röhm in his position would make the Nazis complicit in "crimes of having knowingly and intentionally furthered the seduction of German youths into becoming homosexual minions". In his pamphlet, Klotz claimed that "By publishing the Röhm letters, I make no value judgment against homosexuals", but he did not notice or care that the campaign against Röhm stirred up hatred of homosexuals as well as Nazis.

Röhm sued in an attempt to stop the distribution of the letters, but the lawsuit was thrown out of court as he did not assert that the letters were fakes. The court ruled that there was no illegality in the publication of genuine letters. Röhm admitted to other Nazis that he had written them. The court cases attempting to halt the distribution of the pamphlet regularly featured in the Hamburger Echo for months. SPD newspapers soon picked up on Klotz's pamphlet, publishing excerpts of the letters. The allegations against Röhm found their way into election posters and stickers. The campaign did not target Röhm as much as Hitler and the entire Nazi movement, smearing them as ridden with homosexuality and suggesting that German youth were morally endangered.

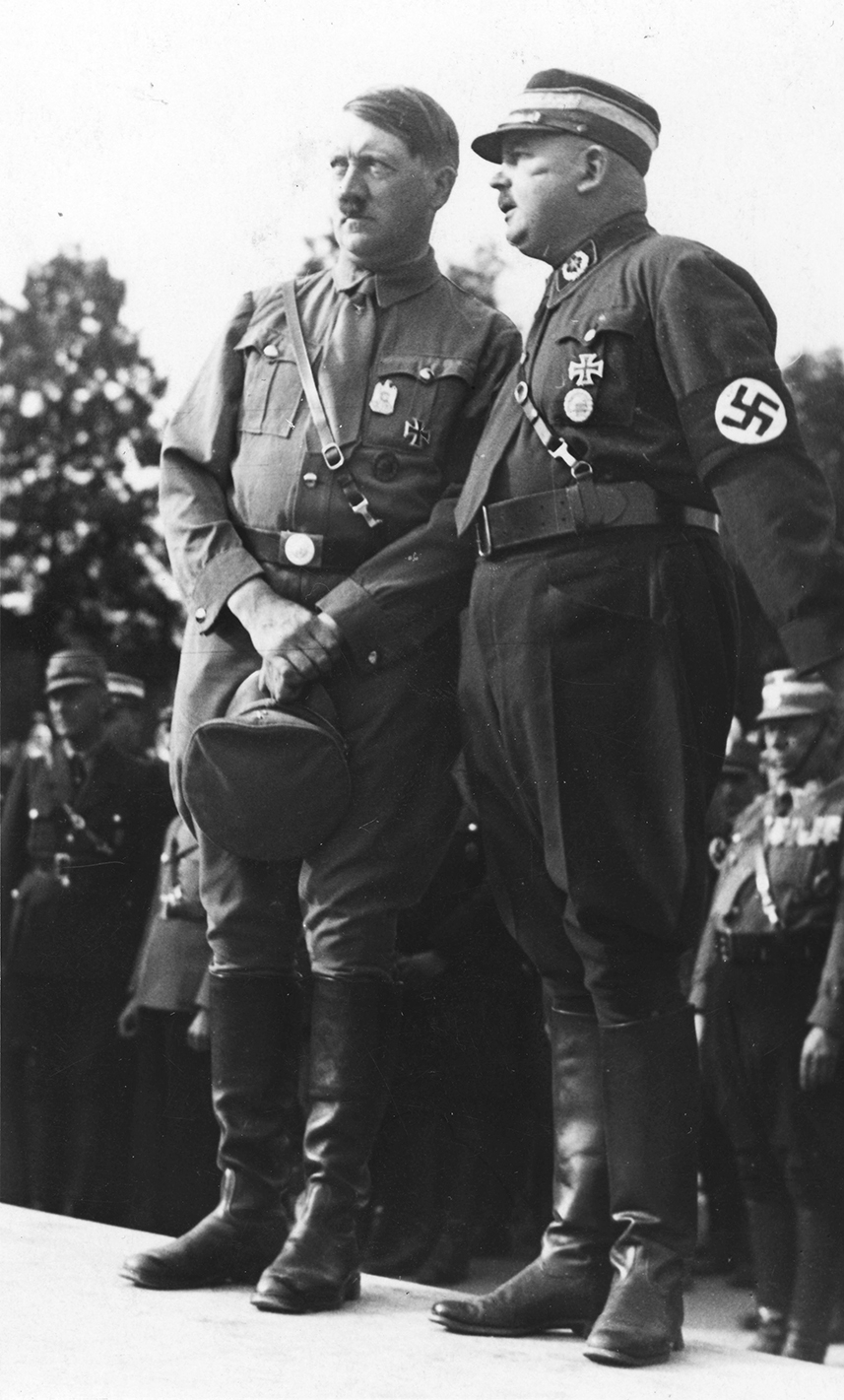
Hitler and Röhm at the Nuremberg rally, 1933

On 6 April, four days before the second round of the presidential election, Hitler defended Röhm and declared that he would remain the SA chief of staff. Röhm later told the Nazi Franz von Hörauf that he had offered his resignation, but Hitler had refused it. Many Nazis were astonished that Hitler had not broken with Röhm, both because of their own prejudices and because they thought he harmed the party's chances of gaining political power. Konstantin Hierl worried the scandal would "break the faith of the masses in the strength and purity of the National Socialist Movement" and hurt the party among conservative voters that Hitler needed to poach from Hindenburg. Historian Andrew Wackerfuss argues that Hitler supported Röhm because of a combination of personal affection, Röhm's professional competence, and a defensive support for his own appointment.

In an effort to protect the Nazi Party from the scandal, in March 1932 Walter Buch put ex-Nazi Emil Danzeisen in charge of a plot to murder Röhm. The plan called for killing Röhm, du Moulin-Eckart, and Röhm's press officer Georg Bell at the Brown House and framing the KPD. Danzeisen engaged the unemployed architect Karl Horn as a hitman, but Horn told the intended victims and the plan fell through. Röhm tried to put an end to the plot quietly by telling Hitler and Heinrich Himmler, while du Moulin-Eckart and Cajetan Graf von Spreti reported it to the Munich police. The plot became public knowledge when covered by the Münchener Post on 8 April. Danzeisen, but not Buch, was tried and convicted for his role in the plot, generating additional negative press coverage for the Nazi Party into late 1932.

Although most media did not report on the scandal until May 1932, Marhoefer argues that knowledge of the scandal was widespread before then. The scandal was unpleasant for the Nazi Party, but it did not affect their electoral performance. Although Hindenburg won the election on the second ballot, Hitler obtained 37 percent of the vote. Historian Larry Eugene Jones writes, "At the very least, the revelations about Röhm were an unwelcome distraction [for Hitler's campaign] ... at worst a damaging blow to the Hitler's credibility as a worthy claimant to the high office of Reich president". On 4 March, the Minister President of Prussia, Otto Braun (SPD), asked Chancellor Heinrich Brüning to bring the Röhm–Heimsoth letters to Hindenburg's attention. Hindenburg remarked privately that in the Kaiserreich, a man in Röhm's situation would have been given a pistol to shoot himself. The scandal made it more difficult for Hindenburg to appoint Hitler chancellor as the latter requested on a meeting on 13 August, accompanied by Röhm and Frick. Hindenburg found it "downright disgusting" to have to meet Röhm and "shake hands with the Hinterlader (faggot)".

=== Assault of Helmuth Klotz in the Reichstag (May 1932) ===
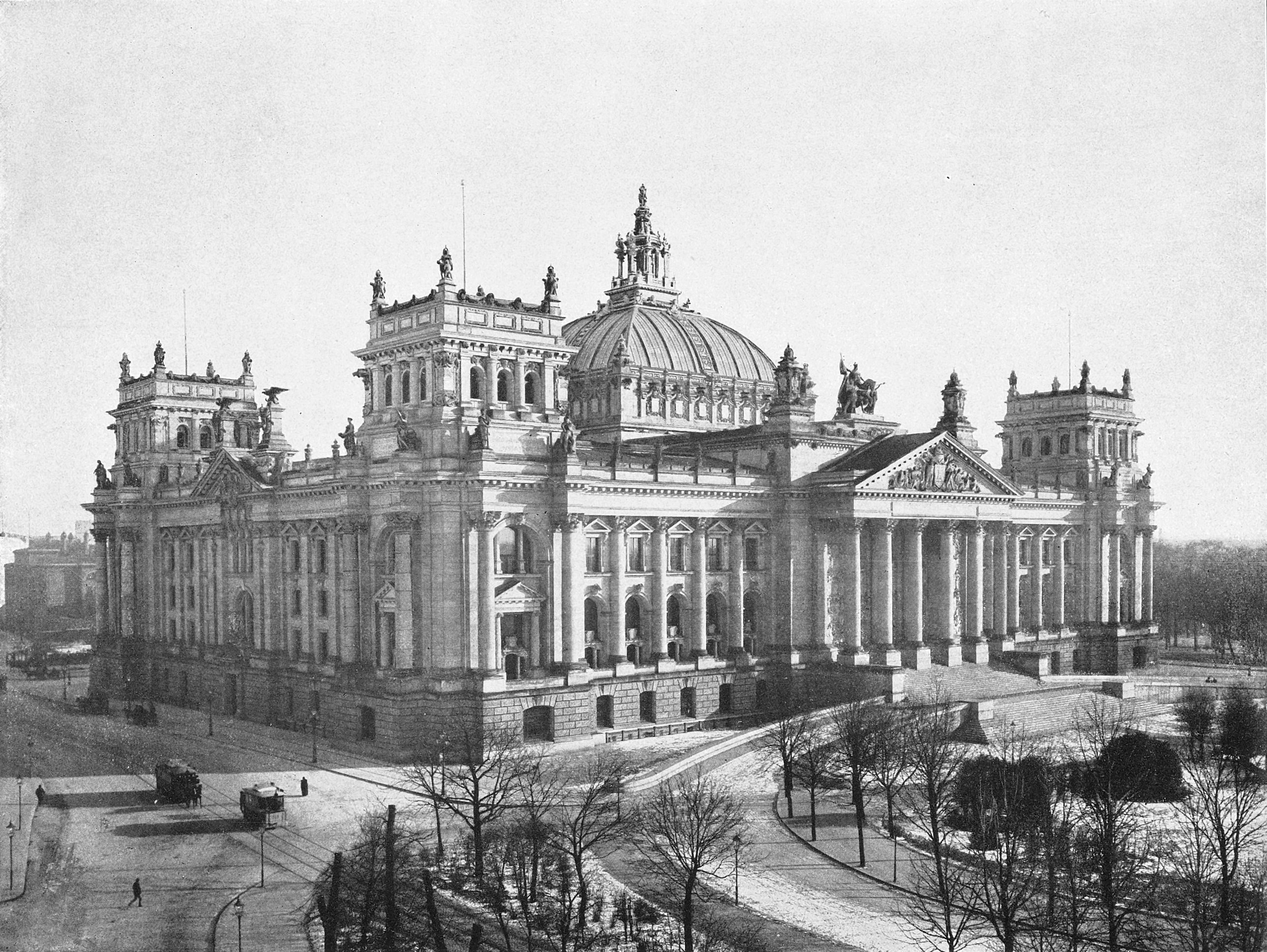
Reichstag building, c. 1900

On 12 May 1932, Klotz visited the Reichstag café to meet SPD chairman Otto Wels. After Wels was called away to a vote, Klotz was recognized by Heines, who had entered the café with a group of Nazi deputies. Heines shouted something to the effect of "You're the hoodlum who published the pamphlet!" and slapped him across the face. The Nazis subsequently assaulted him with their fists and a chair, but fled when a waiter and other deputies intervened. Two policemen appeared at the scene and offered to escort Klotz outside so he could identify his attackers. Klotz agreed, but outside the café they were set upon by dozens of Nazis who assaulted them. Multiple witnesses reported hearing someone shout, "I'll beat him to death". Someone called Klotz's wife and told her to come to the Reichstag "to collect his bones".

Since parliament was in session at the time of the attack, Reichstag president Paul Löbe (SPD) ordered the maximum suspension (30 days) of Heines, Hans Krause, Fritz Weitzel, and Wilhelm Stegmann for assaulting Klotz. He announced that he had called the police to restore order and arrest the four Nazis, who refused to leave. At this news, the entire Nazi Reichstag delegation, 107 men, shouted, "Heil Hitler!" Dozens of policemen under the command of Bernhard Weiß entered the plenary, but were heckled by antisemitic slurs directed at Weiß, who was Jewish. The police struggled to identify the Nazis that they were trying to arrest, although they ultimately succeeded. The ensuing chaos was such that Löbe had to discontinue the parliament's session. A brawl between Nazi and SPD deputies in the plenary was narrowly avoided. The Reichstag never met again before the July 1932 German federal election.

The attack and subsequent trial made the headlines of widely read national newspapers. On 14 May, Krause was acquitted; Heines, Stegmann, and Weitzel were convicted and sentenced to three months in jail. The judge condemned the Nazi deputies for their hooliganism in the Reichstag building, a holy site of democracy, when they could have chosen non-violent methods of resolving their dispute with Klotz. As a result of the attack on Klotz, the Röhm scandal was widely covered on the front pages of German newspapers, although the nature of the scandal was not always specified in the press coverage. Nevertheless, the scandal did not significantly affect the July election. The scandal had not died out by 11 January 1933, when the Münchener Post published an article speculating that Hitler would dismiss Röhm.

== Press coverage ==
The Nazi press responded to the scandal mostly by ignoring it and sometimes by denying nonspecific allegations against Röhm, claiming that they were fabrications by socialists and Jews. It also exaggerated Röhm's military activities in Bolivia, falsely claiming that he was offered the position of Chief of Staff of the Bolivian Army. Marhoefer argues that even convinced Nazi opponents did not necessarily use Röhm's sexuality to attack the party, and argues that this was a success of the homosexual movement in convincing Germans that private sexuality was not their concern: "It is difficult to imagine the national media in the 1930s in a country other than Germany reacting to a homosexual sex scandal about a leading politician with such restraint". Some conservatives and Nazi sympathizers who opposed homosexual emancipation nevertheless portrayed Röhm's sexuality as a matter not of public concern, and Marhoefer argues that this is a sign of acceptance that homosexuality did not necessarily entail expulsion from public life. Nevertheless, she states, "The highly public, persuasive allegations about Röhm's sexuality made it tough for the NSDAP to campaign as a party of moral renewal".

After the Klotz attack, the main message in press coverage was the exposure of the Nazis' violent methods, their "rule of fists" (Faustrecht) as opposed to the rule of law, and antipathy for democracy. Röhm's homosexuality was an issue of secondary or tertiary importance. This was the case for those as far left as the SPD and as far right as the German National People's Party (DVNP). A wide range of conservatives and liberals blamed Klotz for bringing up the issue of Röhm's sexuality. While a considerable number of right-wing papers were hostile to democracy and justified the attack on Klotz, others were uneasy with what they saw as Nazi thuggishness. The Nazi-sympathizing Berliner Lokal-Anzeiger held that "above all the Reichstag building is not the right place to take revenge or vengeance with a series of ear-boxings", although it also condemned Klotz's pamphlet. Far-right Erich Ludendorff published a pamphlet titled "General Ludendorff Says: Let's Get Out of This Brown Swamp!" in which he attacked Hitler for supporting Röhm. The title alluded to the ancient German practice of drowning homosexuals in swamps. Ludendorff's pamphlet was favorably covered by the left-wing media.

The general tenor of the coverage by the SPD was to appeal to homophobia in order to discredit Nazism, and portray homosexuality as embedded in the Nazi Party. For example, Vorwärts appealed to the "healthy people's sentiment" using Nazi terminology, and implied that any boy or young man joining the Hitler Youth or SA was in danger of homosexual predation. Antifascist papers frequently tied together the Nazis' alleged homosexuality with their violence and murder. In October 1932, the Hamburger Echo published a satirical letter from the point of view of a young stormtrooper who does not realize he is the subject of homosexual advances, positing that the SA seduced innocent youth into homosexuality, radical politics, and militarism. Although the KPD had declined to publish the Heimsoth letters, after the scandal broke it responded inconsistently. In the KPD newspaper Welt am Abend it was argued that Röhm abused his position of power to take advantage of economically vulnerable workers. Die Rote Fahne argued that the NSDAP was a breeding ground for homosexuality and Röhm was unsuitable as a youth leader. Only a few leftists criticized the outing. One of these was Kurt Tucholsky, who wrote in Die Weltbühne, "We oppose the disgraceful Paragraph 175 wherever we can; therefore we must not join the choir of those among us who want to banish a man from society because he is homosexual".

In contrast to the left-wing press, homosexual activists emphasized the hypocrisy of the Nazi Party. While homosexual associations such as the League of Human Rights and the Scientific-Humanitarian Committee (WhK) opposed Nazism, they condemned the outing, arguing that Röhm's private life should remain private. Both the WhK and Friedrich Radszuweit, the leader of the League of Human Rights, criticized the SPD for exploiting homophobia to attack the Nazi Party. Although the WhK, whose leadership was dominated by Jews and leftists, understood the existential threat of Nazism, they nevertheless rejected outing as a tactic. Radszuweit wrote that the Nazis' dispute was with the Jews rather than homosexuals, and argued that Röhm's political survival suggested that the Nazis would soon drop their support for Paragraph 175. Bisexual activist Adolf Brand wrote, "when someone ... would like to set in the most damaging way the intimate love contacts of others under degrading control—in that moment his own love-life also ceases to be a private matter". Brand warned that homosexual SA men were "carrying their hangman's rope in their pockets". In the edition of his memoirs published in late 1933, Röhm condemned the scandal, calling it "a large-scale moral campaign ... unprecedented in its shamelessness and meanness".

== Aftermath and legacy ==
Röhm developed even more enemies within the party as a result of the disclosure of his homosexuality and became increasingly isolated. In 1932, he admitted that he had become personally dependent on Hitler, telling Kurt Lüdecke: "My position is so precarious. I can't be too exigent ... I stick to my job, following him blindly, loyal to the utmost—there's nothing else left me". In April 1933, one of Hitler's conservative backers, Reichsbank president Hjalmar Schacht, deplored Röhm and his "homosexual clique" to which he attributed great political power. Röhm was appointed Reich minister without portfolio in Hitler's cabinet in December 1933 and reluctantly confirmed by Hindenburg, thus becoming "probably the first previously known homosexual in a German government" according to historian Michael Schwartz. No other Weimar political party had a known homosexual in its leadership. In 1934, Schulz reflected that any other party in the Weimar Republic would have gotten rid of Röhm within an hour. Marhoefer argues that Röhm became the world's "first openly gay politician" as a result of the scandal. Although the Nazis were willing to temporarily tolerate Röhm and some other homosexuals within its ranks as long as they were useful, the party never adopted this as a general principle or changed its views on homosexuality.

=== Homosexual–Nazi stereotype ===
The Röhm scandal fueled the persistent but false notion that the Nazi Party was dominated by homosexuals, a recurring theme in 1930s left-wing propaganda. In the aftermath of the scandal, leftist paramilitaries began to taunt the SA with shouts of, "Hot Röhm" (Geil Röhm), "Heil Gay" (Schwul Heil) or "SA, Trousers Down!" (SA, Hose runter!), which almost always started a fight. Anti-Nazi jokes alluded to Röhm's homosexuality, such as the following on the ideal German: "Blond like Hitler, tall like Goebbels, slim like Göring, and chaste like Röhm". Sopade reports prepared in 1934 indicated that many Germans had heard of the Röhm scandal before 1933 and associated it with the SPD.

The worldwide bestseller The Brown Book of the Reichstag Fire and Hitler Terror (1933)—a brainchild of KPD politician Willi Münzenberg—claimed that Röhm's assistant Bell, who was murdered in early 1933 in Austria, had been his pimp and had procured Reichstag arsonist Marinus van der Lubbe for Röhm. The book claimed that a clique of homosexual stormtroopers led by Heines set the Reichstag fire; van der Lubbe remained behind and agreed to accept the sole blame because of his desperation for affection; Bell was killed to cover it up. There was no evidence for these claims, and in fact Heines was several hundred kilometers away at the time. Wackerfuss states that Reichstag conspiracy appealed to antifascists because of their preexisting belief that "the heart of the Nazis' militant nationalist politics lay in the sinister schemes of decadent homosexual criminals". In 1933, the persistent scandal around Röhm and other homosexual Nazis was one of the motivations for the criminalization of homosexuality in the Soviet Union—homosexuality was claimed to be a danger to the state and a fascist perversion. Soviet writer Maxim Gorky asserted, "If you just root out all the homosexuals—then fascism will vanish!"

=== Röhm purge ===
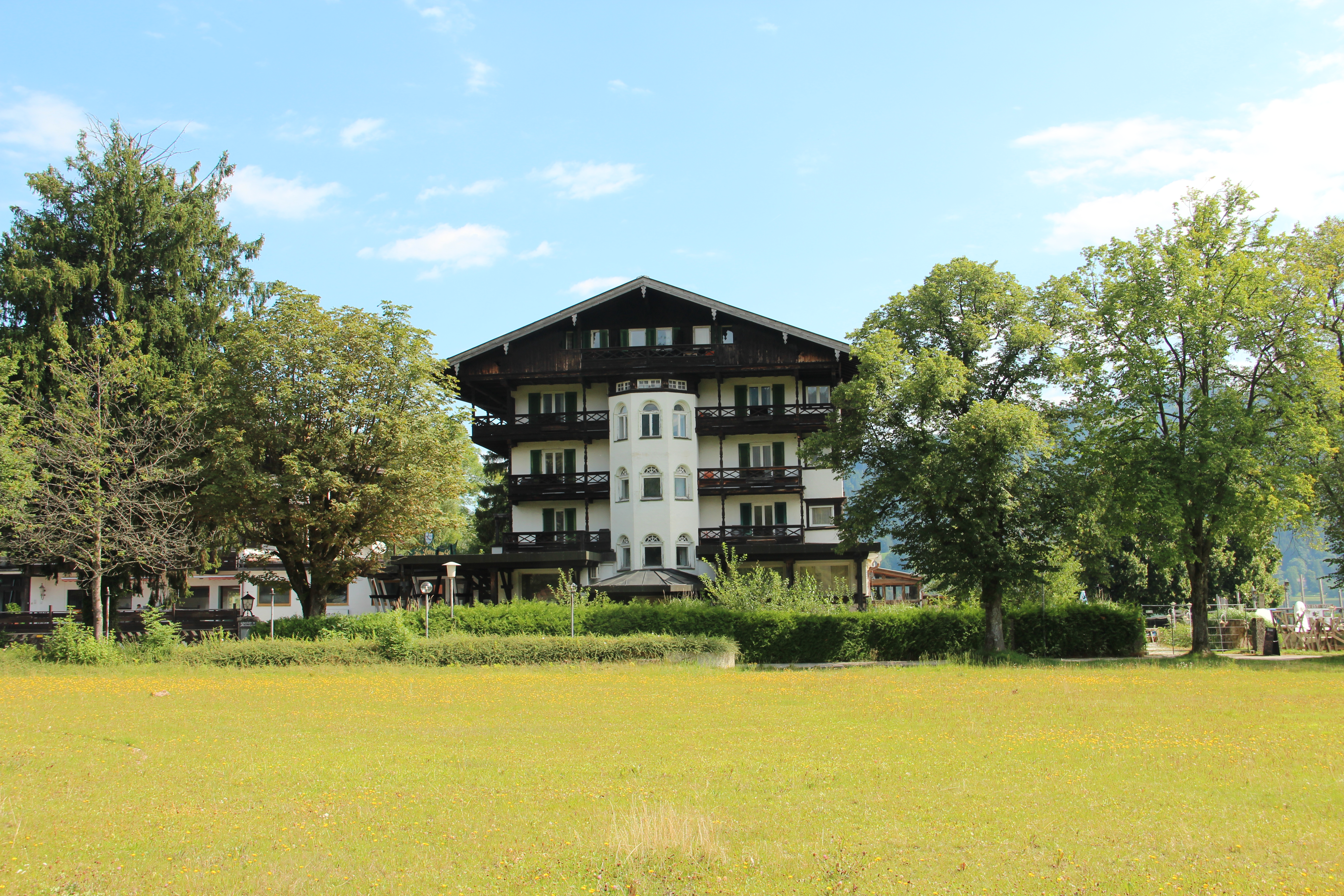
Kurheim Hanselbauer in Bad Wiessee, where Röhm was arrested on 30 June 1934

In mid-1934, Hitler had Röhm, along with most of his close political friends, killed during what he termed the "Night of the Long Knives". Nazi propaganda claimed that Hitler had recently discovered Röhm's homosexuality, and that the murders were a defense against a coup by the SA to overthrow the government. The stereotype of homosexual men as treacherous conspirators connected these justifications. Hitler's explanation was widely accepted by the German public. Wackerfuss argues that, "By deploying public panic against homosexuality, Hitler and the Nazi media won support for their illegal murders and laid further foundations for unchecked state violence". Anti-fascists echoed the Nazis in emphasizing homosexuality as a reason for the purge; Münzenberg claimed that the Nazis killed the SA leadership to eliminate the witnesses to the Nazis' perpetration of the Reichstag fire.

After the purge, homosexual men in Nazi Germany were systematically persecuted. According to Werner Best, Himmler believed that the capture of the state by homosexuals had been narrowly averted. Himmler became determined to hunt down and eradicate homosexual cliques in the Nazi security apparatus. By 1945, Nazi leaders were praising Röhm's ideas about reforming the army and ultimately blaming his homosexuality (rather than their murder of him) for the failure to put these ideas into practice, which they held responsible for the loss of World War II. Goebbels claimed that if Röhm had not been "a homosexual and an anarchist ... in all probability some hundred generals rather than some hundred SA leaders would have been shot on 30 June".

In 1950s West Germany, during the Cold War, the Federal Ministry of Justice cited the Röhm affair as an example of what they called the "danger of homosexual subversion", to justify retention of the Nazis' more punitive revision of Paragraph 175.
