= David Bankier =

German historian

- דוד בנקיר
- Born: 19 January 1947; Zeckendorf camp, Scheßlitz, Germany
- Died: 27 February 2010 (aged 63); Jerusalem, Israel

Academic background
- Education: Hebrew University of Jerusalem
- Thesis: German Society and National Socialist Antisemitism, 1933–1938 (1983)

David Bankier (Hebrew: דוד בנקיר; 19 January 1947 – 27 February 2010) was a Holocaust historian and head of the International Institute for Holocaust Research at Yad Vashem.

== Early life and education ==
David Bankier was born on January 19, 1947 (27 Tevet, 5707), in the Zeckendorf DP camp in the Bamberg district, Oberfranken, Germany, in the then American Occupation Zone. His parents were Holocaust survivors from Ukraine and Poland. From there his family migrated first to Israel and then to Argentina (on reaching adulthood, David immigrated to Israel; the family immigrated to the USA; in the 1980s his parents returned to Israel). Bankier grew up in Argentina; he studied at a public school and at a Jewish school where he consolidated his knowledge of the Hebrew language. In his youth he participated in Zionist activity and in 1967 immigrated to Israel. He began to study Jewish history at the Hebrew University of Jerusalem and in 1983 he completed his doctoral dissertation, “German Society and National Socialist Antisemitism, 1933–1938.”

== Academic career ==
In 1986, David Bankier became lecturer at the Hebrew University of Jerusalem. He would also serve on the editorial board of Contemporary Jewry and Yad Vashem Studies and as associate editor of Holocaust and Genocide Studies.

Bankier's most influential work covered the role of public opinion in Nazi Germany, specifically opinion relevant to Nazi anti-Semitism and to the Nazi Holocaust. His work on this topic involved extensive original research into Sopade reports as well as the internal documentation of the Sicherheitsdienst (SD) regarding German public opinion.
