= Röhm affair =

Röhm affair may refer to:

- Röhm scandal, political scandal in 1931 and 1932 resulting from the public disclosure of Ernst Röhm's homosexuality
- Night of the Long Knives, murder of Röhm and dozens of other Nazis in 1934
