= The Brown Book of the Reichstag Fire and Hitler Terror =

1933 anti-Nazi book

- The cover of the book, in German.
- Cover artist: John Heartfield
- Publication date: August 1933

The Brown Book of the Reichstag Fire and Hitler Terror (German: Braunbuch über Reichstagsbrand und Hitlerterror) is a book published in Paris, France in August 1933. It was written by an anti-fascist group which included German communist Willi Munzenberg, as well as Hans Siemsen and Gustav Regler. It put forth the theory that Nazis were behind the Reichstag fire of 27 February 1933. According to Spanish novelist Antonio Muñoz Molina it was one of the best selling books of all time.

The book details the beginning of Hitler's regime; documenting SA violence against union members and leftists, and it also mentions the Sonnenburg concentration camp which was, at the time, used to imprison political opponents for their “own” protection under the so-called protective custody scheme.

The book claimed that Ernst Röhm's assistant Georg Bell, who was murdered in early 1933 in Austria, had been his pimp and had procured Reichstag arsonist Marinus van der Lubbe for Röhm. The book claimed that a clique of homosexual stormtroopers led by Edmund Heines set the Reichstag fire; van der Lubbe remained behind and agreed to accept the sole blame because of his desperation for affection; Bell was killed to cover it up. There was no evidence for these claims, and in fact Heines was several hundred kilometers away at the time. Nevertheless, the matter was so politically explosive that it was aired at van der Lubbe's trial in Leipzig. Wackerfuss states that Reichstag conspiracy appealed to antifascists because of their preexisting belief that "the heart of the Nazis' militant nationalist politics lay in the sinister schemes of decadent homosexual criminals".

The book's cover was designed by John Heartfield. The book was published in English in Great Britain in September 1933 with a foreword by Dudley Aman, 1st Baron Marley.

== Sources ==
- Göllnitz, Martin (2021). "Homophobie und Revolutionsangst. Die politische Dramaturgie des 30. Juni 1934" [Homophobia and fear of revolution. The political dramaturgy of June 30, 1934]. Revolution in Kiel – Revolutionsangst in der Geschichte [Revolution in Kiel – fear of revolution in history] (PDF). Kieler Schriften zur Regionalgeschichte: Band 8 (in German). Wachholtz Verlag. pp. 209–234. Archived (PDF) from the original on January 16, 2022.
- Rabinbach, Anson (2008). "Staging Antifascism: 'The Brown Book of the Reichstag Fire and Hitler Terror'". New German Critique. 35 (103): 97–126. doi:10.1215/0094033X-2007-021. ISSN 0094-033X. JSTOR 27669222.
- Regler, Gustav (1959). The owl of Minerva; the autobiography of Gustav Regler The owl of Minerva; the autobiography of Gustav Regler. London: R. Hart-Davis.
- Schwartz, Michael (2019). Homosexuelle, Seilschaften, Verrat: Ein transnationales Stereotyp im 20. Jahrhundert [Homosexuals, Political Cliques, and Betrayal: A 20th Century Transnational Stereotype] (in German). De Gruyter. ISBN 978-3-11-063650-5.
- Wackerfuss, Andrew (2015). Stormtrooper Families: Homosexuality and Community in the Early Nazi Movement. Harrington Park Press. ISBN 978-1-939594-06-8.
