= Gerard van den Aardweg =

Dutch psychologist (1936-)

Gerard J. M. van den Aardweg
- Born: 1936 (age 89–90); Haarlem, Netherlands
- Education: University of Amsterdam (PhD)
- Occupations: Psychologist, psychotherapist
- Known for: Research and views on homosexuality, parapsychology, near-death experience, and anti-abortion matters

Gerard J. M. van den Aardweg (born 1936, Haarlem) is a Dutch psychologist and psychotherapist in private practice. He has spoken and written on homosexuality, parapsychology, near-death experience, and anti-abortion matters.

During the 2015 Irish referendum on same-sex marriage, he "claimed the Nazi party was 'rooted' in homosexuals (and that) many scientific institutions have been taken over by 'active militant gays' who produce information to further the gay cause".

In 2017, he signed a document along with a number of other clergy and academics labeled as a "Filial Correction" of Pope Francis.

== Biography ==
Van den Aardweg received his PhD in psychology from the University of Amsterdam with a dissertation published in 1967 under the title "Homophilia, neurosis and compulsive self-pity". It was the Netherlands' first dissertation on homosexuality. Van den Aardweg rejects the idea that homosexuality is a biologically innate trait. Instead, he calls homosexuality (an expression of) "a disease of infantile self pity". Van den Aardweg believes that no one is born gay, that there are no gay children, and that "[h]omosexuality is not equal to heterosexuality. Scientifically this is absolutely absurd."

He is a former member of the National Association for Research and Therapy of Homosexuality's (NARTH) Scientific Advisory Committee.

== Selected works ==
- Gerard J. M. van den Aardweg (August 2011). "On the Psychogenesis of Homosexuality". The Linacre Quarterly. 78 (3): 330–354. doi:10.1179/002436311803888267. ISSN 0024-3639. PMC 6026959. PMID 30082952.
- Gerard J. M. van den Aardweg (1984). On the Origins and Treatment of Homosexuality: A Psychoanalytic Reinterpretation (in Dutch, English, and German). Vol. 2. Bruges: Tabor. p. 98. ISBN 9780275902339. OCLC 898786783.
- The Battle for Normality: Self-Therapy for Homosexual Persons ISBN 0898706149 (1997)
- Hungry Souls ISBN 9780895558992 (2009)
