= Georg Bell =

German engineer and spy (1898–1933)

- Born: 28 July 1898; Nuremberg, Kingdom of Bavaria, German Empire
- Died: 3 April 1933 (aged 34); Durchholzen, First Austrian Republic
- Cause of death: Shot by revolver
- Education: Higher Technical School of Nuremberg
- Occupation: Engineer
- Political party: NSDAP (1931-1932)
- Criminal charge: Counterfeiting
- Spouse: Hildegard Huber
- Espionage activity
- Country: Nazi Germany
- Agency: Sturmabteilung (SA)
- Service years: 1931-1932

Georg Bell (21 July 1898 - 3 April 1933) was a German engineer, counterfeiter, and spy. A close friend and ally of Ernst Röhm, Bell most notably worked as a personal agent of Röhm's to help build a large-scale Sturmabteilung (SA) network.

Born in Nuremberg to a family of Scottish descent, Bell graduated from the Higher Technical School of Nuremberg in electrical engineering in 1921, where he first met Röhm as both were members of the paramilitary organization Reichsflagge. Although for a few years he worked as an engineer in Munich and Nuremberg, his personal life was upended after the revelation of the Chervontsen Affair in 1928. The affair alleged that Bell and other right-wing German spies attempted to destabilize the Soviet Union by triggering extreme inflation by flooding the state with counterfeit Chervonets. After a lengthy and public trial, Bell was found guilty and was issued a small fine, although it led to a wider consequence of senior Nazis having a negative impression of Bell. Subsequently, in 1929, an arrest warrant was issued against Bell in Bavaria for another trial. This time the trial was for betraying military secrets, which reportedly happened after Bell tried to unmask a French spy. The trial ended with Bell getting charged, although much of the details of the trial were destroyed. By 1930, Bell was considered heavily undesirable due to his double convictions, and had significant trouble finding work as an engineer.

In November 1930, Bell and Röhm reunited and subsequently in April 1931 a formal pact was made for Bell to be Röhm's personal agent. He was instructed to set up a large-scale SA spy network, create an SA press office and newspaper, establish a propaganda office, and distance the SA from the rest of the NSDAP. Bell did this through the rest of 1931 into the spring of 1932. During this time he was also reportedly involved in a plan to assassinate Hitler, according to a testimony by Martin Schätzl, but Bell backed out after making a pilgrimage to Konnersreuth. In the spring of 1932, Bell started breaking away from Röhm due to a multitude of reasons, and finally resigned on 8 October 1932. Afterward, he started working for anti-Nazi journalist Fritz Gerlich, digging up plans by Röhm to overthrow Hitler. Finally, in April 1933, SA officers caught up with him while he was in exile in Austria in an inn, and he was shot dead by a revolver.

Although largely still obscure, Bell has received notable attention due to The Brown Book of the Reichstag Fire and Hitler Terror. The book, which extensively mentions Bell, alleges that Bell kept a list of people he had procured for Röhm as his pimp, including Marinus van der Lubbe, who was the cover-up for the Reichstag fire. Although now discredited, especially since certain dates on where Bell would have been don't add up, it played an important role in bringing a wider attention to Bell.

== Early life (1898-1927) ==
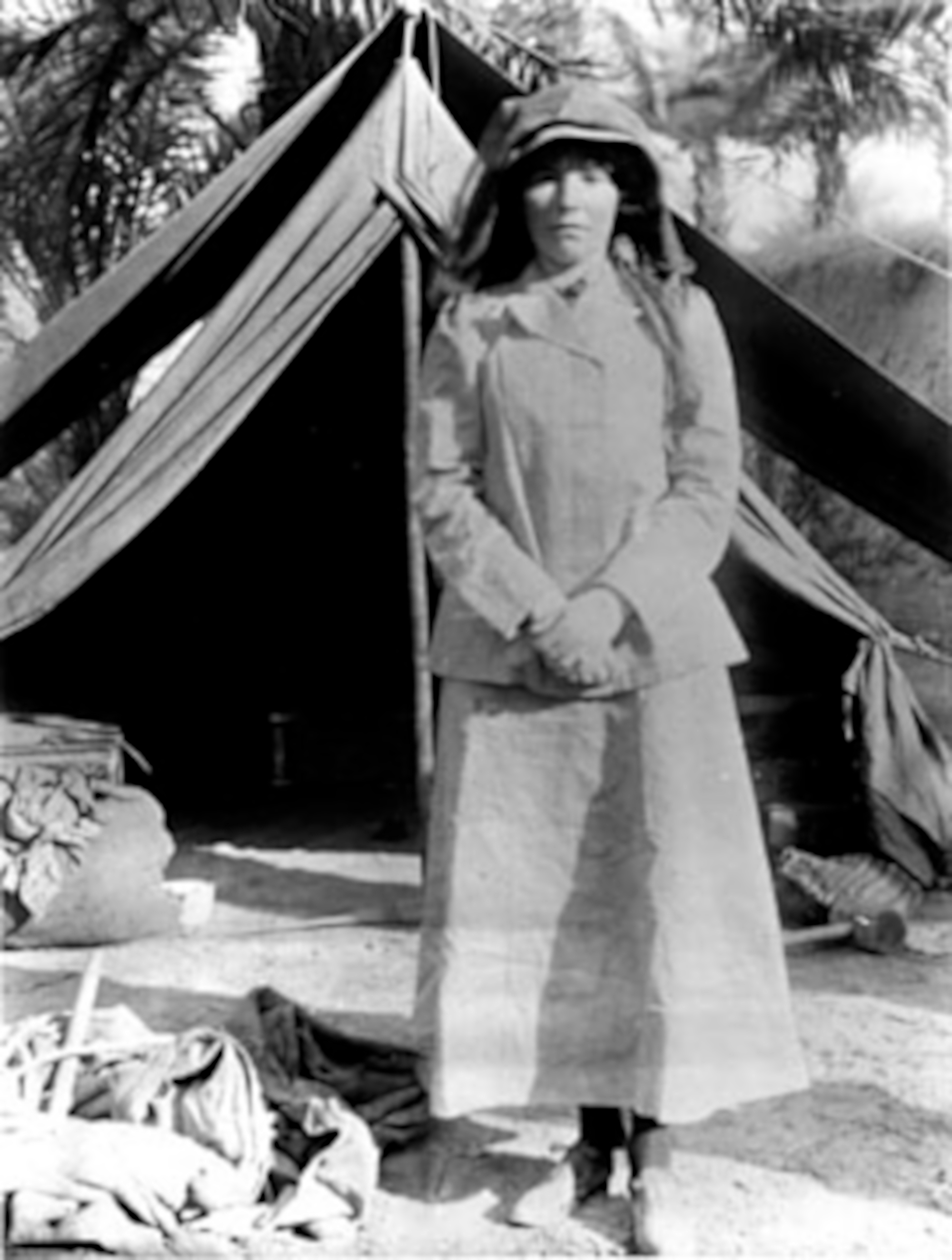
Bell stated multiple times that he was the nephew of Gertrude Bell (pictured here in 1909), although this has now been disproven.

Georg Bell was born on 21 July 1898 in Nuremberg in the German Empire. He was the son of Emil G. Bell (1867–1932), who was the director of a watch factory in Laufamholz, and Babette Bell (née Seiferth; 1874–1920). Bell was ethnically Scottish through his father. Due to his father's surname, Bell stated that an aunt of his was Gertrude Bell, a highly influential archaeologist, although this came from a disproved 1948 article and the Society of Genealogists said that this was not possible. He would also later acquire a step-mother when Babette died in 1920, as his father remarried to Karoline Bell (née Rieger).

Bell attended secondary school in Nuremberg, and then in April 1916 volunteered to join the Bavarian Army in the midst of World War I as a radio operator, which he did until the end of the war in 1918. During his time in the military, he was also deployed to Turkey as a war correspondent.

In 1919, after the end of the war, he began attending a course on electrical engineering at the Higher Technical School in Nuremberg, which he graduated from in 1921. During his time as a student there he first became active in right-wing circles. In 1919 he joined the paramilitary organization Reichsflagge, where the organization's leader, Adolf Heiß, introduced him to Ernst Röhm when Röhm was an I.A. officer in the organization. Afterward, from 1921 to 1927, he worked as an electrical engineer for various companies in Nuremberg and Munich. However, he gave up his work as an electrical engineer on 1 May 1927 upon the revelation of the Chervontsen Affair.

== Legal affairs (1927-1930) ==
=== Chervontsen Affair ===
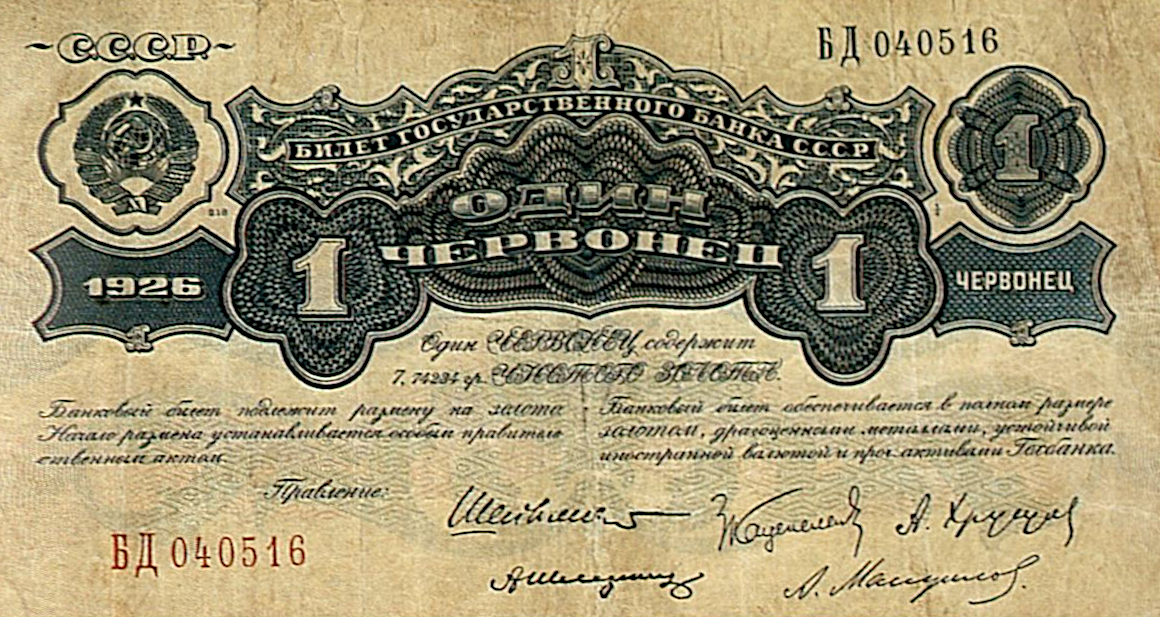
A 1 Chervonets banknote issued by the Gosbank in 1928. Bell and his colleagues in the trial were accused of making counterfeits of this type of bill.

In 1928, Bell's role in the Chervontsen Affair became known to the wider public when the Chervontsen Trial was initiated in 1928. The affair alleged that Bell and a group of other right-wing German spies had attempted to destabilize the Soviet Union by triggering extreme inflation by flooding the state with counterfeit Chervonets. It also alleged that this affair was used to support underground anti-Soviet Georgian independence, as the counterfeit money would supply the regime. According to Sefton Delmer's memoir, Bell had bragged previously that as a secret service agent of the Reichswehr he had counterfeited five-note pounds, francs, and dollar bills. This affair came to light when Frankfurt am Main police discovered large quantities of counterfeit Chervonets ready for shipment to the Caucasus.

Bell was charged alongside two Georgian exiles, Shalva Karumidze and Basilius Sadathieraschwili, with Karumidze claiming that oil magnate Henri Deterding had financed the information. Max Hoffmann and Wolfgang Stresemann were also put under suspicion in the trial, but the former died before the trial could end. The trial was delayed multiple times, especially in February in 1928, when the defense requested an amnesty decree. Again, on 29 July 1928, another amnesty decree was also applied because of the Law on Immunity from Punishment, and the Regional Court ruled to temporarily discontinue the investigation against Bell alongside his arrest warrant. The regional court finally ruled that amnesty for foreigners who had acted against foreign countries was out of question, and that the case was not merely political against Bolshevism but was profit-seeking.

On 6 January 1930, the trial was opened in Moabit with the presiding judge being Judge Wartenberger. Bell was placed in the dock, where the defense lawyers stated that the case was out of jurisdiction since most of the crimes had taken place in Bavaria. The motions about the jurisdiction were rejected. Karumidze revealed that in 1927 he had asked for 15,000 marks from circles close to Bell, which he received from Pavel Bermondt-Avalov and other sources, but alleges he did not know that Bell had secretly deposited 1,000 marks at a German bank. The two Georgians stated that they had done it in Germany because Germany was the first to recognize an independent Georgia and so they had independence circles there who had the "correct picture of Bolshevism" and why this was necessary. On 21 July 1932, the Berlin District Court found Bell and his associates guilty, with Bell receiving a fine of 300 Reichsmarks. An appeals court two years later upheld this. This case led to many leading NSDAP members having a negative impression of him, especially Alfred Rosenberg, as they viewed that Bell had acted out of financial reasons than out of political motives, which was more desirable. Delmer, who reported on the trial, called it "bizarre" as the public was excluded numerous times and many witnesses refused to name anybody and were not forced to do so with the judge even apologizing when Bell refused to name anybody he had visited in the Soviet Union.

=== Bell/Wendt trial ===
On 20 July 1929, the Munich District Court issued an arrest warrant against Bell for an offense against Section 6 of the Law Against the Treason of Military Secrets. The arrest warrant was confirmed on 27 August by the Regional Court of Bavaria, but was revoked on 15 October after it was determined there was no danger of him fleeing. The day it was revoked Bell was released from the court prison at Neudeck, where he had been in custody. As the trial went on, charges were also brought against Karl Franz Wendt. Supposedly, what had occurred was that Bell had tried to unmask a French spy but had accidentally betrayed military secrets, and the trial ended in December 1929 with Bell's conviction for betrayal of military secrets, although much of the details of the trial are unknown since its file was destroyed.

== Spy career (1930-1933) ==
=== Work for Ernst Röhm ===
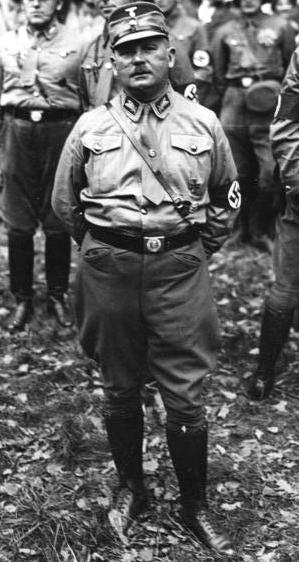
Röhm in 1931, the same year that Bell began working as a secret agent for him.

In November 1930, Ernst Röhm and Bell met once again as they had not stayed in contact since their time in the Reichsflagge, and Röhm was seeking his own sources of intelligence following the Sturmabteilung (SA)'s weakened position. By the time Bell met again with Röhm he was considered heavily undesirable due to his double convictions in the 1929 Chervontsen and Wendt trials, and he had great difficulty finding work.

On 21 April 1931 at 3:00, Bell made a formal pact with Röhm to be his personal agent in the presence of Karl Leon Du Moulin-Eckart. The contract set out Bell's duties and his salary which was 350 Reichsmarks and victuals. Bell later described the orders given to him were to concentrate on structuring the SA independent of the Nazi party, establish a large-scale SA spy network at home and abroad, create an SA Press office and a newspaper called Der SA-Mann, and establish a propaganda office and collect financiers. The pact was signed with a handshake and a word of honour, with Bell agreeing that he would succeed or fall alongside him. He did not find many financers besides Henri Deterding, who had financed him in the Chervonets affair, who gave 1.5 million pounds. In the autumn of 1931 he also formally joined the NSDAP in Endorf with a membership number of 290,055.

During the rest of 1931 and beginning of 1931, Bell was an informer to Röhm and made numerous trips abroad. With Bell's support, Röhm made numerous contacts in London and Paris to create an independent SA. He was also the one to have broken the news to Hitler about Geli Raubal's death and take him from Nuremberg to Berlin He also approached Sefton Delmer, asking him to report on what the British government's reaction was to reports on the SA and accused him of already being a spy.

=== Alleged assassination plot against Adolf Hitler ===
An alleged testimony from Martin Schätzl, a victim of the Night of Long Knives, stated that Bell belonged to a group that planned to assassinate Hitler, even though Röhm never thought Hitler was mentally ill or wanted him murdered.

The plan was initiated because the group felt like the attempt to seize power by electoral means that Hitler employed in the July 1932 German federal election was misguided, and instead, it was necessary to return to violent coups like that of the previous Beer Hall Putsch. However, Bell made a pilgrimage to Konnersreuth, where Therese Neumann lived, which made him abandon the plan to kill Hitler. It was then alleged that Heydrich found out and wanted to get hold of the confidant of Röhm's betrayal, Bell.

Dornheim says the plot may have been true, because there was already "Reich without Hitler" plans between Deterding and Röhm. However, there is debate over whether this plan ever existed. In the book Ernst Röhm: Hitler's SA Chief of Staff, historian Eleanor Hancock says she was skeptical about Schätzl's document and the validity of the claims.

=== Resignation from NSDAP ===
In the spring of 1932, Bell started breaking from Röhm. This was probably sparked by the leaking of an assassination plot to the press that Walter Buch was going to perpetrate, and Hitler identified the leaker as Du Moulin-Eckart, who he had removed. With the reorganization of the SA, Bell started gradually distancing himself after Rohm refused to listen to his criticisms of Eckart's work and because he did not pay him properly or punctually. In the summer of 1932, he also came into contact with Fritz Gerlich, the publisher of the newspaper Der Gerade Weg, which led him to start supporting Gerlich's campaign and provide him with inside information from the SA and become a Nazi opponent.

On 8 October 1932, Bell formally resigned from the NSDAP. In a letter to the Brown House, Bell stated his reasons for resigning which included: the destroyed relationship between him and Röhm, the difference between Bell and other Röhm associates, and the straining between him and Röhm since Bell was not homosexual. However, subsequent newspapers reported that Bell had been expelled under suspicion of espionage, even though Bell formally sent the letter.

=== Exile and work for Gerlich ===
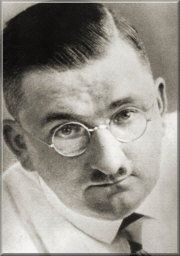
After his departure from the NSDAP, Bell began working for anti-Nazi journalist Fritz Gerlich (pictured here in 1929).

The so-called Röhm and Deterding agreement refers to an alleged arrangement that proposed replacing Adolf Hitler with Ernst Röhm. According to claims connected to investigations by Fritz Gerlich, it was reported that Julius Uhl had been designated as the individual tasked with eliminating Hitler should the plan have been finalized. However, the scheme fell apart with Röhm's death during the Night of Long Knives.

According to Gerlich's secretary, Miss Breit, Bell had given some papers to Gerlich before he fled that contained details about the Reichstag fire, the agreement between Deterding and Röhm to replace Hitler, a list of witnesses to the fact that Hitler had murdered Geli Raubal, plans for discrediting the church, and Deterding's backing of the SA. On 7 March 1933, Bell went with Gerlich to the residence of Eugen Bolz in Stuttgart to deliver the originals of the papers with the information about Röhm and his plan against Hitler, in the hopes that it would enlighten Paul von Hindenburg that the Nazi leadership was unstable. However, a governor of Hitler's was at the gates of Stuttgart and they were forced to turn around, and the papers were then given to Bolz's brother, Konstantin von Waldburg-Zeil, who lost them.

After their return, on 9 March, Gerlich and Bell went to the editorial office of the Der Gerade Weg in Hofstatt. Unbeknownst to them, SA hordes had stormed through the office, and arrested Gerlich upon their arrival while Bell escaped through the roof window, who then decided to flee to Austria the next morning. During this time, he reportedly appeared late at night at Carl von Jordans's place, an anti-Nazi politician, and said that he feared for his life because he knew what actually occurred during the Reichstag fire. He also met with Willi Münzenberg at the Vorarlberg/Swiss border to discuss information which would be turned into the book The Brown Book of the Reichstag Fire and Hitler Terror.

Röhm was reported to have said, "Bring me Bell alive or dead! I prefer to be alive," to the SA officers that left to get Bell. Although Röhm was generally considered the person to order Bell's death, sometimes Reinhard Heydrich is stated as the client, which most historians view as highly unlikely since Heydrich would have wanted him alive in order to get information on Röhm.

==== Murder ====
On 3 April 1933, the three automobiles with the SA officers arrived near the Austrian border with Rosenheim. The executioner - Uhl - showed the Austrian border guards a card bearing the stamp of the political police of Munich and they were allowed to pass through and arrived at the Plattl Inn in Durchholzen. He had changed his place of residence several times, including to Salzburg, before coming to Durchholzen on 1 April. The officers then asked the waitress to announce where Georg Bell was, and they went up to the first floor where Bell was. Bell then talked to the first group which included one of his former students, while four or five more officers got out of the automobiles, presumably including Uhl. This group then cut the telephone wires, went up the stairs, and announced that the police in Munich had something to say. They then elaborated that he was in custody but he would be released if he returned to Germany. However, when Bell tried to resist, Uhl shot him five times with a revolver. The automobiles then fled over the border to Germany.

In subsequent trials, Ludwig Kuchler and Erich Sparmann, who were part of the SA members that went to kill Bell, were sentenced to three years each in prison while there was a search for a purported Viennese detective named Ponnert.

== Personal life ==
In 1929 he met Hildegard Huber (born 1905), who he got engaged to at Easter 1931. Huber was the daughter of a hotelier who was friends with the Röhm family.

He was described as a giant man who always wore a heavy ulster coat accompanied with a tartan tie.

== Legacy ==
Pierre de Villemarest argued that Bell was the person behind Sydney Warburg, a pen name that published a book alleging that funding of the Nazi party came from American bankers from 1929 to 1933. In the comic album The Black Island, written in 1938, Bell is believed to be loosely personified as the antagonist, Dr. J.W. Müller. Hergé was believed to have taken inspiration from a February 1934 issue of Le Crapouillot, where an article by Antoine Zischka mentions Bell and his attempt at counterfeiting, as Dr. Müller is also engaged in the practice.

=== The Brown Book ===
Bell is extensively mentioned in The Brown Book of the Reichstag Fire and Hitler Terror. The book alleges that he was the pimp for Ernst Röhm, maintaining a list of people he had procured for Röhm to compromise the Nazi Party, and that he had procured Marinus van der Lubbe for him in September 1931. It also states a group of gay stormtroopers set the Reichstag fire while van der Lubbe was used to cover it up and Bell was murdered because of this. However, the book had no evidence for this plot, and the list that Bell was said to have written is considered a forgery. Although one of the book's authors, Willi Münzenberg, did meet with Bell in March 1933 at the Vorarlberg/Swiss border, Münzenberg and his group constantly changed Bell's role through the editions. In the first edition of the book, he was still part of the Nazi circle, instead of maintaining a list to compromise the party, and made propaganda phone calls after seeing the fire even though he was not at the Reichstag when it burned down on 27 February 1933.
