= Hofstatt =

Hofstatt may refer to:

- Hofstatt (shopping mall), a shopping mall in Munich, Germany
- Hofstatt railway station, a railway station in Lower Austria
- House plots in medieval Switzerland, called Hofstatt in German
