= House plots in medieval Switzerland =

Medieval house plots in Switzerland

House plots in medieval Switzerland (German: Hofstatt or Hofstätte, plural Hofstätten; French: chesal, plural chesaux; Italian: casale; Latin: area) were delimited plots of land, in the countryside or in towns, that formed part of a lordship and were tied to a house or to the building of a house. In the towns founded in French-speaking Switzerland during the High Middle Ages, the plots are narrow, elongated rectangles at right angles to the street. The rights and duties of the burghers originally rested on the possession of such a plot inside the town walls.

== Terminology ==
The Latin word casale, from which the chesal of French-speaking Switzerland, the casale of Italian-speaking Switzerland and the casal of southwestern France derive, has several meanings, all of them related to the idea of a house. It can denote the house itself or the ruins of a house. In most cases, however, casale denotes the plot of land on which the house is built. In the countryside, the casale, which within the framework of landed lordship forms part of a mansus, can be fairly extensive: it carries not only the family house but also its farm buildings and sometimes at least part of the land cultivated by the household. In French-speaking Switzerland, the term chesal is used mainly for urban plots. The Latin term area is also used; German-speaking Switzerland renders it as Hofstätte.

== Urban plots ==
Detail of the cadastral plan of Lausanne by Jean-Philippe Rebeur, around 1679, showing the Bourg quarter. The narrow rectangular house plots (chesaux) are perpendicular to the axis of the main street.

In the towns founded in French-speaking Switzerland during the High Middle Ages, such as Villeneuve or Rolle, and in the new quarters and suburbs added at that time to existing settlements, such as the Bourg quarter in Lausanne or the Grande-Rue (rectus vicus) of Saint-Maurice, the house plot (chesal) has the very characteristic shape of a narrow, elongated rectangle whose axis is perpendicular to that of the street. These plots are in principle contiguous and give the town plan its typical appearance, which can still be recognized today. Because the narrow surface of the plot is entirely built over, the houses of these new towns or streets all touch one another and, seen from outside, present the appearance of a compact block.

In German-speaking Switzerland, and particularly in the towns founded by the Zähringen (for example Bern), a distinction was made between area and casale. The area was the unit for the collection of the ground rent (cens) and could easily be divided into casalia.

== Taxation and legal function ==
In the Savoyard lands, where it has been studied to some extent, the house plot (chesal) was the basis of a levy called the droit de toise or toisé. It was calculated in proportion to the length, measured in toises, of the short side of the rectangle, the one facing the street. This number of toises is often recorded for each building in the registers of recognitions (registres de reconnaissances), and it helps historians to reconstruct the medieval cadastre.

House plots (chesaux or areae) had an important legal function. The land surrounding the house formed, together with the house, a space protected by law. All the rights and duties of the burghers (taxes, military service, access to the courts, election to the council) originally rested on the possession of a plot inside the town walls. Both in the new towns and in the extensions of older towns, when new building was planned, the lord granted house plots of equal size to several inhabitants in hereditary tenure. In return, they paid a fixed ground rent. In the new towns, the plots were units of account and administration. The lord intended to retain superior ownership of the land allotted to the users. When the influence of the lords declined, most plots became the full property of the burghers, who were thenceforth exempt from seigneurial dues.

== Bibliography ==
- H. Strahm, "Die Area in den Städten", in Schweizer Beiträge zur Allgemeinen Geschichte, 3, 1945, 22–61
- R. Brondy, "Patrimoine immobilier et structures sociales dans les États de Savoie d'après le droit de toisé (XIV^{e}–XV^{e} siècles)", in Cahiers d'histoire, 26, 1981, 213–230
- M. Grandjean, "Villes neuves et bourgs médiévaux, fondement de l'urbanisme régional", in L'homme dans la ville, 1984, 61–100
