= Sidney Warburg =

Group of authors of work about the Nazi Party

- Writing career
- Language: English
- Period: 1933
- Genres: Essay, Mémoires, Forgery, Imposture
- Notable work: Hitler's Secret Backers (English translation title)

Sidney Warburg (1880–1947) is the pen name of an author or a group of authors who remained anonymous and who published a book about funding of the Nazi Party by American bankers between 1929 and 1933. The book's Dutch title De geldbronnen van het Nationaal-Socialisme: drie gesprekken met Hitler refers to three conversations Warburg said Sidney would have had with Adolf Hitler. The original states that the text was "Door Sidney Warburg, vertaald door J.G. Schoup" (By Sidney Warburg, translated by J.G. Schoup).

== Publication history ==
The original version of this book was published in 1933 under the title De geldbronnen van het nationaal-socialisme, 3 gesprekken met Hitler (Financial origins of national socialism) in the Netherlands. According to Jean Gustave Schoup (sometimes spelled as Jan Gustaaf Schoup) the original text was a report in the English language provided by Sidney Warburg to him, which he turned into a Dutch language book. After the book came out the Dutch publisher, Van Holkema & Warendorf, learned from various sources that no "Sidney Warburg" existed in the New York Warburg family and, around January 1934, called back all copies from book dealers and destroyed the whole edition.

A German version exists with the title: So wurde Hitler finanziert, Das verschollene Dokument von Sidney Warburg über die internationalen Geldgeber des Dritten Reiches, herausgegeben und eingeleitet von Ekkehard Franke-Gricksch, Verlag Diagnosen, Leonberg 1983, ISBN 3-923864-00-0.

The original Dutch text was republished in 2008 together with an introduction by Karl Hammer Kaatee.

== Book summary ==
The so-called "Sidney Warburg", presented by the translator of 1933 as the son of a great American banker of Kuhn, Loeb & Co (Felix Warburg), describes a meeting had taken place in July 1929 with a "Carter" (John Ridgley Carter, who married Alice Morgan) the president of JP Morgan's Guarantee Trust, the leaders of the Federal Reserve, "the young Rockefeller" – John D. Rockefeller Jr. – and "Glean from Royal Dutch" (Henri Deterding). It was decided that Warburg who spoke German, had to travel to Germany and ask Hitler how much money he needed to become head of state. The only condition was that Hitler would take an "aggressive foreign policy". The expressed intention of the sponsors of Warburg was to counter France, not cause war but the threat of war because of the divergence of interest between the French on German reparations, versus the financial elite of the United States and Great Britain, countries which were also parties to the Treaty of Versailles.

"Sidney Warburg" details three meetings with Hitler between 1929 and 1933. In total approximately $32 million were transferred to the NSDAP.

=== 1929 ===
The first meeting took place in a brewery and Hitler calculated his needs on a sheet of paper with the help of a Von Heydt. It appears from the book that Hitler would have received nearly $10 million in 1929. This was a very significant amount in this time of economic depression – the Nazis gave food and shelter to many supporters. Hitler was not informed of the reason for their help and did not ask. On one occasion he would have asked out loud if "Warburg" was himself Jewish, but had rejected the idea before he could answer.

=== 1931 ===
In October 1931, Warburg received a letter informing him that Hitler had spent all the 10 million and needed new financing. Back in Germany, he met Hitler again in his home, where he asked for "500 million marks to make a revolution or 200 million marks for acquiring power legally". Warburg, having telegraphed his bankers, received a refusal message. He was visited by Hermann Göring and Julius Streicher and was literally caught in part by Göring, who accused him of avarice. After having complained to Hitler about the behavior of his lieutenant, he received a letter of apology from Göring and next a visit from Von Heydt and Gregor Strasser. He eventually passed on the final response of his sponsors: $15 million at most. The amount was divided into three transfers: one at Mendelsohn & Co., Amsterdam, where he traveled with Von Heydt; the other in the Rotterdamsche Bankvereniging, Rotterdam, where he went with Gregor Strasser; and the third at Banca Italiana in Rome with Göring. In Rome, Italo Balbo and Cesare Rossi received them, him and Göring.

=== 1933 ===
Warburg is in Berlin on the day of the Reichstag fire. On the evening of that day he meets Göring and Goebbels, and finally he met Hitler. Hitler asks again if he is a Jew but he responds by saying that he has a German name. Warburg promises Hitler $7 million payable directly to Warburg via Rhenania Joint Stock Co., the German branch of Royal Dutch in Düsseldorf. The book concludes with considerations by Warburg about predicting anything good on the consequences of these money transfers: The world continues to suffer under a system that has to bow to a Hitler to keep itself on its feet. Poor world, poor humanity!. The NSDAP and Hitler came to power.

=== Epilogue ===
The book concludes with an unsigned epilogue that has been written in 1946. This epilogue was not written by Sidney Warburg. In the epilogue it has been mentioned that Joseph Goebbels wrote the following in his diary Von Kaiserhof zur Reichskanzlei on February 20, 1933: "We are in the process of raising significant funds which will resolve our financial problems at once." However, it is unclear whether this jubilant exclamation from Goebbels refers to the Sidney Warburg transaction.

== Analysis ==
The book that has been published under the pseudonym Sidney Warburg, De Geldbronnen van het nationaal Socialisme: drie gesprekken met Hitler (Funding of National Socialism: Three Conversations with Hitler), published by Van Holkema & Warendorf's Uitg.-Mij. NV, disappeared almost immediately from bookstores. This book dealt with funding received by the Nazi Party in 1929, 1931 and 1933.

Franz von Papen recommends the book in his memoirs that were published in 1953.

Henry Coston wrote in 1975 that Otto Strasser alone is the author.

The editor of the English version of Hitler's Secret Backers wrote in 1983 that the original edition of this book might have been a warning by an individual member of the Warburg family against the coming European war.

Pierre de Villemarest wrote in 1984 that the pseudonym Sydney Warburg could refer to Georg Bell, a German engineer acting as an agent of Henri Deterding, or the brothers Otto Strasser and Gregor Strasser.

According to what E.R. Carmin wrote in 1994 the book is a factual testimony as to Des Griffin.

In the introduction of the 2008 edition Karl Hammer Kaatee wrote that J.G. Schoup's son had admitted that J.G. Schoup had published under a pseudonym what he had learned himself as a spy about Hitler's financial backers.

The author Ben Peri evokes the theme in a pamphlet published in 2011.

According to what the journalist Louis Kilzer wrote in 2011, James Paul Warburg is the person named in the book as intermediary, that he is the perpetrator or not.

Cees van Hoore described Jean Gustave Schoup in 2014 as follows: "Schoup was not only a talented writer but also a crook who boasted about his contacts inside the German Sicherheitsdienst. He told the resistance that he could liberate arrested resisters by paying ransom to these German contacts. However, Schoup kept the money for himself. I think this is why Schoup has been liquidated in 1944."

Jasper Wielaert proved previously in 2014 that Schoup, aiming to profit, did indeed cunningly deceive the resistance. Nevertheless, he also arranged hiding places for Jewish people. Above that Jasper Wielaert makes it thoroughly clear that corrupt members of the Rotterdam resistance in 1944–1945 were equally involved in seeking financial gain. Wielaert hints that the individuals involved in the assassination may have been interested in murdering him not just because of his scams, but for their own very personal reasons.

== Denial ==
For Jacques Attali, the Sidney Warburg in question, posing the son of Felix Warburg, Warburg is imaginary, from which no one has carried this name of Sidney It will be worth many family denials and false pamphleteer published in Amsterdam will be awarded to a Dutch journalist scandal. The book was the subject of an indignant denial in 1949, as a signed declaration (an affidavit) by James Warburg, son of one of the two Warburg brothers implicated in the book.

== See also ==
- Sydney Warburg approximates about another later book whose provenance is uncertain repeating verbatim the thesis summarizing and adding the financing of international communism by international finance : Symphony in red.
