= Harrington Park Press =

LGBTQ book publisher

- Founder: Bill Cohen
- Country of origin: United States
- Headquarters location: New York City
- Distribution: Columbia University Press
- Publication types: Books
- Nonfiction topics: LGBTQ topics
- Official website: harringtonparkpress.com

Harrington Park Press (HPP) is an academic/scholarly book publisher based in New York City, specializing in LGBTQ topics such as diversity, inclusivity, and equality.

Originally an imprint of The Haworth Press, Inc. (now part of the Routledge/Taylor & Francis Group), Harrington Park Press is now being run independently by Bill Cohen (Mr. Cohen was the founding publisher of The Haworth Press, Inc.).

The relaunched Harrington Park Press published its first book, Male Sex Work and Society, in 2014. The press continues to publish multiple works per year relating to LGBTQ issues, including Stormtrooper Families (2015) and Fundamentals of LGBT Substance Use Disorders (forthcoming 2016).

Harrington Park Press is distributed by Columbia University Press to the institutional, academic, and retail markets in the United States and internationally.
