= Journal of the History of Sexuality =

- Discipline: History
- Language: English
- Edited by: Ishita Pande and Nicholas L. Syrett

Publication details
- History: 1990–present
- Publisher: University of Texas Press (United States)
- Frequency: Triannually
- Impact factor: 0.324 (2010)

Standard abbreviations
- ISO 4: J. Hist. Sex.

Indexing
- ISSN: 1043-4070 (print); 1535-3605 (web)
- JSTOR: 10434070
- OCLC no.: 46673214

Links
- Journal homepage; Online archive

The Journal of the History of Sexuality is a peer-reviewed academic journal established in 1990 and published by the University of Texas Press.

== Indexing ==
The Journal of the History of Sexuality is indexed and/or abstracted in America: History and Life, Bibliography of the History of Art, Criminal Justice Abstracts, Current Contents/Social and Behavioral Sciences, Historical Abstracts, International Bibliography of Periodical Literature, MLA Directory of Periodicals, MLA International Bibliography, and Social Sciences Citation Index. According to the Journal Citation Reports, the journal has a 2013 impact factor of 0.487, ranking it 10th out of 72 journals in the category "History" and 102nd out of 138 journals in the category "Sociology".
