= Arlene Stein =

American sociologist and author

- Occupations: Author, sociologist, professor
- Awards: Ruth Benedict Prize; Simon and Gagnon Lifetime Achievement Award

Academic background
- Education: Amherst College; University of California, Berkeley

Academic work
- Discipline: Sociology
- Institutions: Rutgers University; University of Essex; University of Oregon
- Notable works: The Stranger Next Door; Sex and Sensibility

Arlene Stein is an American sociologist and author best known for her writing about sex and gender, the politics of identities, and collective memory. She is Distinguished Professor of Sociology at Rutgers University and former director of the Institute for Research on Women. Stein has also taught at the University of Essex and at the University of Oregon.

== Early life and education ==
Stein grew up in New York City and graduated from the Bronx High School of Science. She attended Amherst College from which she received her BA in history in 1980. She studied at University of California, Berkeley where she obtained an MA in 1985 and a PhD in sociology in 1993.

== Scholarship ==
Stein's work explores intersections among personal and political change, and how social movements construct knowledge particularly about gender and sexuality, employing interviewing, narrative analysis, and ethnographic research methods. Her 1997 book Sex and Sensibility: Stories of a Lesbian Generation traces accounts by women engaged in feminist and gay/lesbian movements noting challenges to the culturally dominant medical definitions of lesbianism. Stein's 2018 book Unbound: Transgender Men and the Remaking of Identity explores new varieties of gender that challenge hegemonic masculinity. The Stranger Next Door: The Story of a Small Community's Battle over Sex, Faith, and Civil Rights focuses on a town in the United States Pacific Northwest that passed a ballot initiative designed to outlaw gay/lesbian rights. Stein establishes that opposition to LGBT rights in the United States became a way to constitute Christian fundamentalism, and illustrates ways that conservative social movements construct knowledge and shape public opinion about sexuality. Reluctant Witnesses: Survivors, Their Children, and the Rise of Holocaust Consciousness examines the rise of Holocaust memory in the United States. It draws on interviews and participant observation with Holocaust survivors and their children to describe how the Holocaust became widely discussed and understood.

== Awards ==
Stein received the American Anthropological Association's Ruth Benedict Prize in 2001 for her second monograph, The Stranger Next Door: The Story of a Small Community’s Battle over Sex, Faith, and Civil Rights. In 2006, Stein received the American Sociological Association Simon and Gagnon Lifetime Achievement Award for her career contribution to the study of sexualities.

Sex and Sensibility: Stories of a Lesbian Generation was a finalist for the 1998 Non-Fiction Stonewall Book Award, and The Stranger Next Door: The Story of a Small Community’s Battle over Sex, Faith, and Civil Rights was a 2002 Stonewall Honor Book in Non-Fiction.

== Other publications ==
- Stein, Arlene (2006). Shameless: Sexual Dissidence and American Culture. New York University Press. ISBN 978-0814740286.
- Stein, Arlene; Daniels, Jessie (2017). Going Public: A Guide for Social Scientists. University of Chicago Press. ISBN 978-0226364780.
