= Sopade reports =

The Sopade reports, officially Germany reports of the Sopade (Deutschland-Berichte der Sopade), were a series of reports published by the executive committee of the Social Democratic Party of Germany in exile (Sopade) between 1934 and 1940 about the situation in Nazi Germany. The Sopade organized in the countries bordering Germany and relied on its illegal organization inside Germany for information. Initially the reports were published in Prague, Czechoslovakia, but in 1938 the Sopade relocated to Paris, France. The Sopade reports are considered a valuable although biased source on public opinion in the Nazi dictatorship, along with the Security Service reports.
