= Stormtrooper Families =

Book about Nazism and homosexuality

- Author: Andrew Wackerfuss
- Publisher: Harrington Park Press
- Publication date: 2015

Stormtrooper Families: Homosexuality and Community in the Early Nazi Movement (2015) is a book by the American historian Andrew Wackerfuss. It focuses on Nazism and homosexuality and received generally favorable reviews. The book was published by Harrington Park Press.
