= Mental health of Adolf Hitler =

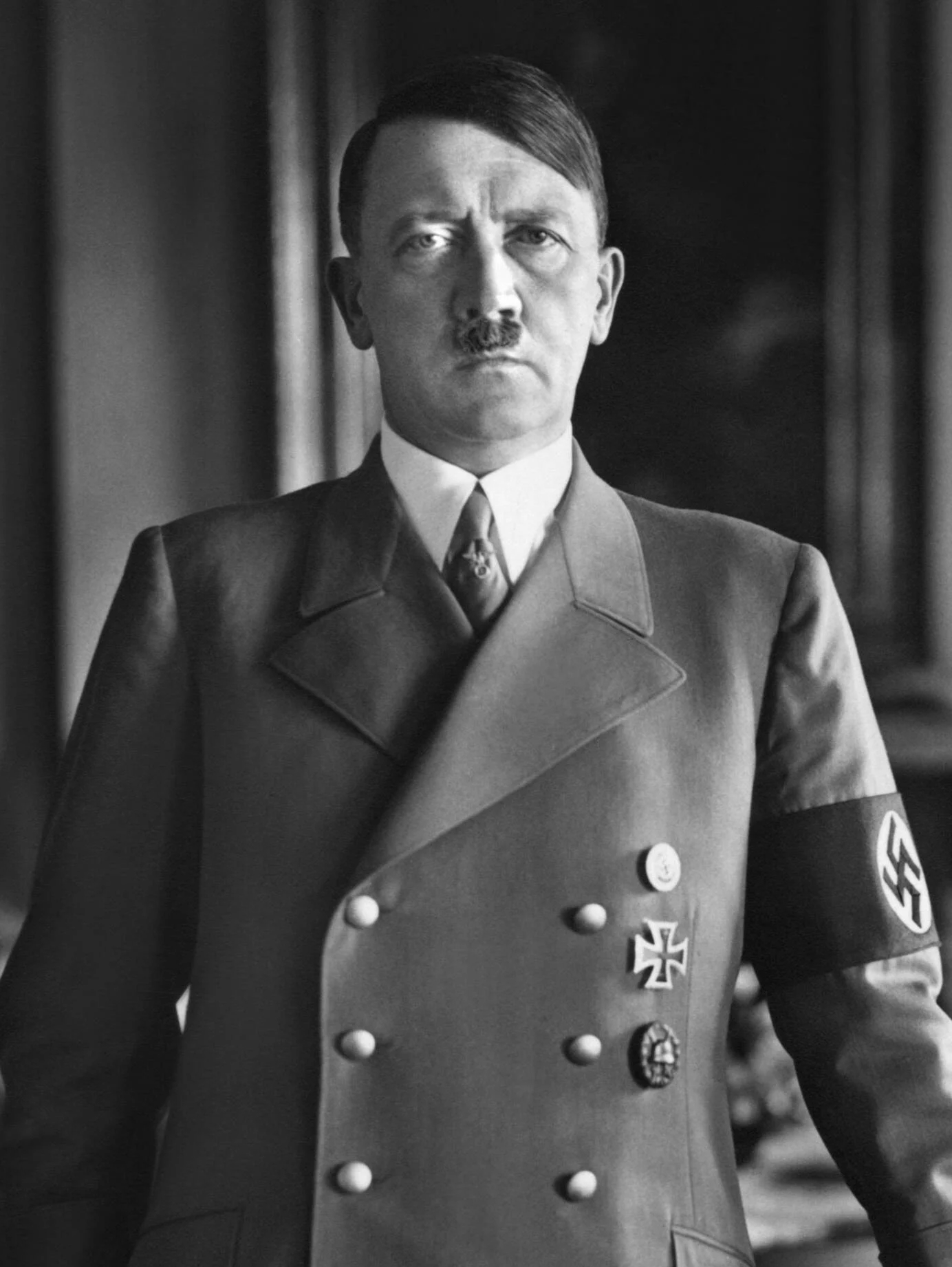
Portrait of Nazi leader Adolf Hitler, 1938

Although Adolf Hitler was never formally diagnosed with any mental illnesses during his lifetime, he has often been associated with psychiatric conditions such as bipolar disorder, schizophrenia, psychopathy, and amphetamine psychosis, both during his lifetime and after his death. The disturbances have been incorporated into psychobiographies of Hitler. Psychiatrists and psychoanalysts who have diagnosed the dictator as having such mental states include well-known figures such as Walter C. Langer and Erich Fromm. Other researchers like Frederick Redlich have not been persuaded that Hitler evidenced such disorders.

== Background ==
=== Difficulty of Hitler's psychopathography ===
German philosopher Hannah Arendt, who attended the trial of Adolf Eichmann (pictured) in 1961, believed that the willingness to commit genocide can be entirely compatible with good mental health.

In psychiatry, pathography has developed a poor reputation, especially diagnostics that have been carried out ex post, without the direct examination of the patient. It is even considered unethical. German psychiatrist Hans Bürger-Prinz went so far as to state that any remote diagnostics constitute a "fatal abuse of psychiatry". The immense range of mental disorders that Hitler has been credited with over time indicates how inconclusive this method can be. Another example of the deficiencies present in many of the following Hitler-pathographies is an either completely absent or grossly abbreviated discussion of the abundance of publications which have already been submitted on this subject by other authors.

In the case of Hitler, psychopathography poses particular problems. First, authors who write about Hitler's personal matters have to deal with the problem that a possibly voyeuristic readership uncritically accepts even the most sparsely proven speculations – such as that which happened in the case of Lothar Machtan's book The Hidden Hitler (2001). Some authors warn that pathologising Hitler would inevitably mean discharging him of at least some responsibility for his actions.

Others fear that by pathologising or demonising Hitler, all the blame for the crimes of Nazi Germany could be placed entirely on him, whilst the populace and those in positions of power who enabled Hitler to rule would consequently be relieved from responsibility. Famed is Hannah Arendt's invention of the phrase the "banality of evil"; in 1963, she stated that for a Nazi perpetrator as Adolf Eichmann, mental normality and the ability to commit mass murder were not mutually exclusive. Harald Welzer came to a similar conclusion in his book Täter. Wie aus ganz normalen Menschen Massenmörder werden [Perpetrator. How ordinary people become mass murderers].

In his 2015 biography, Peter Longerich pointed out how Hitler implemented his political goals as a strong dictator, with assertiveness, high readiness to assume risk and unlimited power. Some authors were fundamentally opposed to any attempt to explain Hitler, for example by psychological means. Claude Lanzmann went further, labeling such attempts "obscene"; after the completion of his film Shoah (1985), he felt such attempts bordered on Holocaust denial, with particular criticism directed towards historian Rudolph Binion.

As psychiatrist Jan Ehrenwald has pointed out, the question as to how a possibly mentally ill Hitler could have gained millions of enthusiastic followers who supported his policies until 1945 has often been neglected. Daniel Goldhagen argued in 1996 that Hitler's political ascent was not in any way related to his psychopathology, but rather was a consequence of the precarious social conditions that existed at that time in Germany. Some authors have noted that figures such as Charles Manson and Jim Jones, who have been described as having a severe mental illness such as schizophrenia, nonetheless succeeded in having a tremendous influence on their groups of followers.

Early on, the view was also expressed that Hitler was able to handle his psychopathology skillfully, and was aware of how he could use his symptoms to effectively steer the emotions of his audience. Other authors have suggested that Hitler's followers themselves were mentally disturbed. Evidence for this claim was not produced. In 2000, the question of how Hitler's individual psychopathology might have been linked with the enthusiasm of his followers was first discussed by the interdisciplinary team of authors Matussek, Matussek, and Marbach.

=== List of alleged disorders ===
Alleged disorder	Author(s)
Hysteria, histrionic personality disorder	Wilmanns (1933), Murray (1943), Langer (1943), Binion (1976), Tyrer (1993)
Schizophrenia, paranoia	Vernon (1942), Murray (1943), Treher (1966), Schwaab (1992), Tyrer (1993), Coolidge/Davis/Segal (2007)
Psychotic symptoms due to drug abuse	Heston/Heston (1980)
Psychotic symptoms due to physical illness	Gibbels (1994), Hesse (2001), Hayden (2003)
Narcissistic personality disorder	Sleigh (1966), Bromberg/Small (1983), Coolidge/Davis/Segal (2007)
Sadistic personality disorder	Coolidge/Davis/Segal (2007)
Borderline personality disorder	Bromberg/Small (1983), Victor (1999), Dorpat (2003), Coolidge/Davis/Segal (2007)
Post-traumatic stress disorder	Dorpat (2003), Koch-Hillebrecht (2003), Vinnai (2004), Coolidge/Davis/Segal (2007)
Abnormal brain lateralization	Martindale/Hasenfus/Hines (1976)
Schizotypal personality disorder	Rappaport (1975), Waite (1977)
Dangerous leader disorder	Mayer (1993)
Bipolar disorder	Hershman/Lieb (1994)
Asperger syndrome	Fitzgerald (2004)

== Hysteria ==
=== Hitler in Pasewalk military hospital (1918) ===
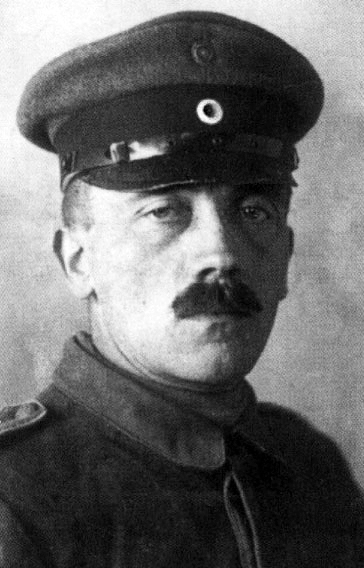
Hitler in 1921

Oswald Bumke, a psychiatrist and contemporary of Hitler, assumed Hitler was never examined by a psychiatrist. The only psychiatrist whom Hitler demonstrably met personally – Munich professor Kurt Schneider – was not Hitler's physician. While medical documents that allow conclusions about Hitler's physical health have been found and made accessible for research, there is a lack of original documents that allow for an assessment of his mental condition.

Speculations about a possible psychiatric evaluation of Hitler, in his lifetime, focus on his stay in a military hospital, Pasewalk, at the end of 1918. Hitler was admitted to the hospital after mustard gas poisoning, to which he was exposed during a battle in Flanders. In Mein Kampf, he mentions this hospital stay in connection with his painful temporary blindness, and with the "misfortune" and "madness" of the German revolution of 1918–19 and of Germany's defeat in World War I, both of which he learned about during his recovery, which triggered a renewed blindness. Hitler and his early biographers, took great notice of his strong physical response to the historic events, because this relapse into blindness identified the turning point in which Hitler felt the vocation to become a politician and Germany's saviour.

Already in Hitler's lifetime, some psychiatrists judged that such a relapse without organic explanation must be described as a hysterical symptom. The diagnosis of hysteria had its peak heyday with Sigmund Freud's psychoanalysis, but was still in use in the 1930s and 1940s. Loss of the sense organs were among typical symptoms, in addition to self-centred and theatrical behaviour. Psychiatrist Karl Wilmanns supposedly said in a lecture: "Hitler has had a hysterical reaction after being buried alive in the field"; Wilmanns then lost his position in 1933. His assistant, Hans Walter Gruhle, suffered professional disadvantages due to similar statements. In modern psychiatry, the term "hysteria" is no longer in use. Today, corresponding symptoms are associated with dissociative disorder or histrionic personality disorder.

Little is known about Hitler's hospital stay. It is not even certain what symptoms were presented. Hitler's medical record from Pasewalk that could confirm or refute a diagnosis was already considered lost in the late 1920s.

==== A Psychiatric Study of Hitler (1943) ====
During World War II, the United States intelligence agency, Office of Strategic Services (OSS), collected information about Hitler's personality and commissioned a research team led by Walter Charles Langer to develop psychological reports in 1943. In one of these reports, titled A Psychiatric Study of Hitler, the hypothesis was developed that Hitler was treated in Pasewalk by psychiatrist Edmund Forster, who in 1933 committed suicide for fear of reprisals. The starting point of this report was the testimony of psychiatrist Karl Kroner who also worked in the hospital in 1918. Kroner confirmed in particular that Forster had examined Hitler and that he had diagnosed him with "hysteria".

The report was held under lock and key, but in the early 1970s rediscovered by Hitler-biographer John Toland. At least some reject Kroner's testimony. Jan Armbruster and Peter Theiss-Abendroth (2016) write "Having barely escaped a German concentration camp, Karl Kroner found it difficult to make a living in Iceland because his medical diploma wasn't recognized by the local authorities. Thus, he may have tried to accelerate his visa process to the US by making himself irreplaceable. Given the obvious exaggerations and distortions in his narrative and the tremendous pressure he was under, he may serve as a witness for a number of things – but certainly not for such a crucial aspect of history as the one in question here."

==== I, the Eye Witness (1963) ====
In 1939, Austrian physician and writer Ernst Weiss, who lived in France in exile, wrote a novel, Ich, der Augenzeuge ("I, the eye witness"), a fictional autobiography of a doctor who cured a "hysterical" soldier A.H. from Braunau who had lost his eyesight in the trenches. The plot is set in a Reichswehr hospital at the end of 1918. Since his knowledge could be dangerous to the Nazis, the fictional physician is placed in a concentration camp in 1933 and released only after he surrenders the medical records.

Weiss committed suicide in 1940 after German troops entered Paris. He was Jewish and had feared deportation. His novel was published in 1963. Weiss's knowledge of Hitler's hospital stay was believed to have come from the contemporary biographical literature.

==== Speculation about hypnotherapy ====
Starting with the assumptions of the intelligence report and following Weiss' novel, a series of researchers and authors have, consecutively, developed suspicions about a possible involvement of Forster in a supposedly securely established hypnotherapy. These reconstructions are questionable because they do not provide any new evidence. They also exclude alternative interpretations from the outset, widely disregard the historical context, and overlook that Forster held a view of hysteria that would have led him to other methods of treatment than hypnosis.

- Rudolph Binion, a historian at Brandeis University, considers the supposed hysteria diagnosis as a fallacy; in his 1976 book Hitler among the Germans, however, he picked up the secret service's suspicions and expanded them. Binion assumed that Weiss had met Forster in person and received from him a copy of the medical record on which his novel then was based. Following the novel, Binion then assumes that Forster subjected the blind, fanatical Hitler to a hypnotic suggestion treatment, and later, after being suspended from the civil service and in fear of persecution by the Gestapo, took his own life. The only evidence for these assumptions is construed from Forster's legacy, while there is not even proof of what sort of contact Forster had with Hitler.
- In 1998, David E. Post, a forensic psychiatrist at Louisiana State University, published a paper in which the hypothesis that Forster had treated Hitler's supposed hysteria with hypnosis was depicted as a proven fact. Post did not include any documented personal research.
- Partially inspired by Binion, British neuropsychologist David Lewis published The Man Who Invented Hitler (2003). Lewis portrayed Forster's hypnosis as fact and a reason for Hitler's transformation from an obedient soldier to a strong-willed, charismatic politician. In the book, Forster is called the "creator" of Hitler.
- Another book inspired by Binion was published by Manfred Koch-Hillebrecht, a German psychologist and professor emeritus of politics at the University of Koblenz: Hitler. Ein Sohn des Krieges (2003). Koch-Hillebrecht tried to prove that Hitler had post-traumatic stress disorder and describes how Forster subjected his alleged patient to shock therapy in order to make him able to fight again in combat.
- In Germany in 2004, lawyer Bernhard Horstmann published his book Hitler in Pasewalk, in which he describes how Forster had "healed" Hitler with a "brilliantly" used hypnosis not only from his hysterical blindness, but also endowed him with the feeling of omnipotence and the sense of mission that became so characteristic for Hitler as a politician. In this book, no other evidence is put forward as the story of Weiss' novel.
- In 2006, Franziska Lamott, a professor of forensic psychotherapy at the University of Ulm, wrote in an article: "[ ... ] as confirmed in the medical records of treatment of Corporal Adolf Hitler by the psychiatrist Prof. Edmund Forster, the latter freed him from hysterical blindness using hypnosis".

Critical comments on these speculations appeared early on. But as psychiatric historian Jan Armbruster (University of Greifswald) judged, they were not sufficiently convincing, such as in the case of journalist Ottmar Katz, author of a biography of Hitler's personal physician, Theodor Morell (1982). Katz suggested that Karl Kroner might have had personal reasons to report some untruths: living as a Jewish refugee in Reykjavík and forced to earn his life as a blue-collar worker, Kroner possibly hoped that U.S. authorities would acknowledge him as a key witness and help him to reestablish his medical practice.

In 2008, a comprehensive plausibility test was performed by Berlin psychiatrist and psychotherapist Peter Theiss-Abendroth. In 2009, Armbruster carried this analysis forward, dismantled the hypotheses of Hitler's hysteria diagnosis and hypnotherapy completely, and showed in detail how the story of Hitler's alleged treatment by Forster became progressively elaborate and detailed between 1943 and 2006, not due to the evaluation of historical documents, but to continuous addition of narrative embellishments. Armbruster's work offers the to date most comprehensive critique of the methodological weaknesses of many Hitler pathographies.

=== Walter C. Langer (1943) ===
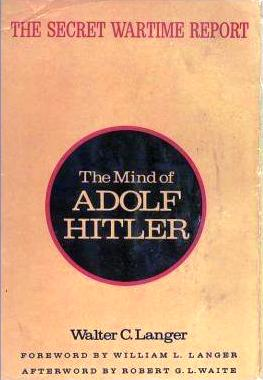
The cover of The Mind of Adolf Hitler

One of the few authors that stated Hitler showed signs of hysteria without using the Pasewalk episode and Hitler's alleged treatment by Forster as main evidence, was American psychoanalyst Walter C. Langer. Langer secretly wrote his study in 1943 on behalf of the OSS. He and his team conducted interviews with many people who were available to U.S. intelligence services and who knew Hitler personally. They came to the final judgment that Hitler was "a hysterical at the edge of schizophrenia". The study was for a long time held under lock and key and published in 1972 under the title The Mind of Adolf Hitler.

== Psychosis ==
Already in his lifetime, many elements in Hitler's personal beliefs and conduct were classified by psychiatrists as signs of schizophrenia, for example, his faith that he was chosen by fate to liberate the German people from their supposed enemy, the Jews.

=== W. H. D. Vernon (1942) and Henry Murray (1943) ===
One of the first who credited Hitler with the classic symptoms of schizophrenia was Canadian psychiatrist W.H.D. Vernon. In 1942, he argued in an essay that Hitler was experiencing hallucinations, hearing voices, paranoia, and megalomania. Vernon wrote that Hitler's personality structure – although overall within the range of normal – should be described as leaning towards the paranoid type.

In 1943, Henry Murray, a psychologist at Harvard University, expanded upon these views. Like Langer, Murray wrote his report, Analysis of the Personality of Adolph Hitler, on behalf of the OSS. He came to the conclusion that Hitler, next to hysterical signs, showed all the classic symptoms of schizophrenia: hypersensitivity, panic attacks, irrational jealousy, paranoia, omnipotence fantasies, grandiose delusions, belief in a messianic mission, and extreme paranoia. He considered him as perched between hysteria and schizophrenia, but stressed that Hitler possessed considerable control over his pathological tendencies and that he deliberately used them in order to stir up nationalist sentiments among the Germans and their hatred of alleged persecutors. Like Langer, Murray thought it likely that Hitler eventually would lose faith in himself and in his "destiny", and then commit suicide.

=== Wolfgang Treher (1966) ===
Attempts to prove that Hitler had a fully developed psychosis in a clinical sense have only occasionally been made. An example is the book Hitler, Steiner, Schreber (1966) by Freiburg psychiatrist Wolfgang Treher. Treher explains that both Rudolf Steiner (whose belief in anthroposophy he attributes to mental illness) and Hitler had schizophrenia. He writes that both managed to stay in touch with reality because they had the opportunity to create their own organisations (Steiner: the Anthroposophical Society; Hitler: the NSDAP and its many subdivisions) that they could influence according to their delusions – and therefore avoid the, normally expected, "schizophrenic withdrawal". Treher finds that Hitler's megalomania and paranoia are quite striking.

=== Edleff Schwaab (1992) ===
In 1992, German-American clinical psychologist Edleff H. Schwaab published his psychobiography Hitler's Mind in which he states that Hitler's imagination – particularly his obsession with the supposed threat posed by the Jews – must be described as the outcome of a paranoia. The cause for this disorder Schwaab suspects to be rooted in a traumatic childhood that was dominated by a depressive mother and a tyrannical father.

=== Paul Matussek, Peter Matussek, Jan Marbach (2000) ===
The book Hitler – Karriere eines Wahns (2000) is the result from a joint effort of psychiatrist Paul Matussek, media theorist Peter Matussek, and sociologist Jan Marbach, to overcome the tradition of one-dimensional psychiatric pathography and to seek an interdisciplinary approach, taking into account socio-historical dimensions. The investigation is focused not so much on Hitler's personal psychopathology, but on a description of the "interaction" between individual and collective factors that accounted for the overall dynamics of the Hitler madness.

The book specifies the interplay between Hitler's leader role, which was charged with psychotic symptoms, and the fascination that this role invoked in his followers. The authors conclude that the Nazi crimes had been an expression of madness, but of a madness which was so strongly accepted by the public that the psychotic Hitler and his followers were factually stabilising each other in their "mad" worldview.

=== Frederic L. Coolidge, Felicia L. Davis, Daniel L. Segal (2007) ===
In terms of methodology, the most elaborate psychological assessment of Hitler was undertaken in 2007 by a research team at the University of Colorado. This study differed from all earlier works by its open, exploratory approach. The team tested systematically which mental disorders Hitler's behavior may or may not have been indicating. It was the first Hitler pathography that was consistently empirical. The psychologists and historians reviewed passed down reports by people who knew Hitler, and evaluated these accounts in accordance with a self-developed diagnostic tool that allowed for a wide range of personality, clinical, and neuropsychological disturbances to be measured. According to this study, Hitler showed obvious traits of paranoia, but also of anti-social, sadistic, and narcissistic personality disorders, and distinct traits of post-traumatic stress disorder.

=== Organically caused psychotic symptoms ===
Hitler's alleged psychotic symptoms have repeatedly been attributed to possible organic causes. Psychiatrist Günter Hermann Hesse, for example, was convinced that Hitler experienced long-term consequences of gas poisoning during World War I.

==== Syphilis ====
In the late 1980s, Ellen Gibbels at the University of Cologne attributed the limb trembling in Hitler's later years to Parkinson's disease, a widely held consensus in the research community. However, some researchers interpreted Hitler's tremor as a symptom of advanced syphilis, including American historian Deborah Hayden in 2003. Hayden linked the general paresis from which Hitler – in her opinion – had had since 1942, to the mental decline in the last years of his life, especially to his "paranoid temper tantrums". Psychiatrist Frederick Redlich reported that there is no evidence that suggests that Hitler had syphilis.

==== Parkinson's disease ====
The possibility that Hitler had Parkinson's disease was first investigated by Ernst-Günther Schenck and later by Gibbels. In 1994, Gibbels published a paper that pursued the question if Hitler's nerve disease could also have impaired him mentally.

== Psychopathy/antisocial personality disorder ==
Given the inhumanity of his crimes, Hitler was early on linked with "psychopathy", a severe personality disorder whose main symptoms are a great or complete lack of empathy, social responsibility, and conscience. The biologically determined concept still plays a role in psychiatric forensic science, but it is no longer found in the modern medical classification systems (DSM-IV and ICD-10). Today, corresponding clinical pictures are mostly classified as signs of an antisocial personality disorder. However, the symptomatology is rare, and unlike in popular discourse, where the classification of Hitler as a "psychopath" is commonplace, psychiatrists have only occasionally endeavored to associate him with psychopathy or antisocial personality disorder.

=== Gustav Bychowski (1948) ===
Early on, some Hitler pathographies took psychological, and historical and sociological aspects into account. This interdisciplinary approach was developed by psychiatrist Wilhelm Lange-Eichbaum in 1928. The earliest socio-psychological pathography of Hitler appeared in 1948 in Gustav Bychowski's anthology Dictators and Disciples. Bychowski, a Polish-American psychiatrist, compared several historical figures who successfully carried out a coup d'état: Julius Caesar, Oliver Cromwell, Maximilien Robespierre, Hitler, and Joseph Stalin. He concluded that these men had an abundance of traits that must be classified as "psychopathic", such as the tendency to act out impulses, or to project their own hostile impulses onto other people or groups.

=== Desmond Henry, Dick Geary, Peter Tyrer (1993) ===
In 1993, the interdisciplinary team of Desmond Henry, Dick Geary, and Peter Tyrer published an essay in which they expressed their common view that Hitler had antisocial personality disorder as defined in ICD-10. Tyrer, a psychiatrist, was convinced that Hitler furthermore showed signs of paranoia and of histrionic personality disorder.

== Depth psychological approaches ==
While psychiatrically oriented authors, when dealing with Hitler, were primarily endeavouring to diagnose him with a specific clinical disorder, some of their colleagues who follow a depth psychological doctrine as the psychoanalytic school of Sigmund Freud, were first and foremost interested in explaining his monstrously destructive behaviour.

In accordance to these doctrines, they assumed that Hitler's behaviour and the development of his character were propelled by unconscious processes that were rooted in his earliest years. Pathographies that are inspired by depth psychology typically attempt to reconstruct the scenario of Hitler's childhood and youth. Occasionally, authors such as Gerhard Vinnai started out with a depth psychological analysis, but then advanced far beyond the initial approach.

=== Erich Fromm (1973) ===
Among the most famous Hitler pathographies is Erich Fromm's 1973 book Anatomy of Human Destructiveness. Fromm's goal was to determine the causes of human violence. He took his knowledge of Hitler from several sources such as the memoir of Hitler's boyhood friend August Kubizek (1953), Werner Maser's Hitler biography (1971), and, most important, a paper by Bradley F. Smith about Hitler's childhood and youth (1967).

Fromm's pathography follows largely Sigmund Freud's concept of psychoanalysis and states that Hitler was an immature, self-centred dreamer who did not overcome his childish narcissism. As a result of his lack of adaptation to reality, he was exposed to humiliations which he tried to overcome by means of lust-ridden destructiveness ("necrophilia"). The evidence of this desire to destroy – including the so-called Nero Decree – was so outrageous that one must assume that Hitler had not only acted destructively, but was driven by a "destructive character".

=== Helm Stierlin (1975) ===
In 1975, German psychoanalyst and family therapist Helm Stierlin published his book Adolf Hitler. Familienperspektiven, in which he raised the question of the psychological and motivational bases for Hitler's aggression and passion for destruction, similarly to Fromm. His study focuses heavily on Hitler's relationship to his mother, Klara. Stierlin felt that Hitler's mother had frustrated hopes for herself that she strongly delegated to her son, even though for him, too, they were impossible to satisfy.

=== Alice Miller (1980) ===
In 1980, Swiss childhood researcher Alice Miller gave Hitler a section in her book For Your Own Good. Miller owed her knowledge about Hitler to biographic and pathographic works such as those by Rudolf Olden (1935), Konrad Heiden (1936/37), Franz Jetzinger (1958), Joachim Fest (1973), Helm Stierlin (1975), and John Toland (1976). She wrote that the family setting in which Hitler grew up was dominated by an authoritarian and often brutal father, Alois Hitler, and could be characterised as "prototype of a totalitarian regime". She wrote that Hitler's hate-ridden and destructive personality, that later made millions of people suffer, emerged under the humiliating and degrading treatment and the beating that he received from his father as a child.

Miller believes that the mother, whose first three children died at an early age, was barely capable of fostering a warm relationship to her son. She posits that Hitler early on identified with his tyrannical father, and later transferred the trauma of his parental home onto Germany. His contemporaries followed him willingly because they had experienced a childhood that was very similar.

Miller pointed out that Johanna Pölzl, the querulent sister of Klara Hitler who lived with the family throughout Hitler's entire childhood, possibly had a mental disorder. According to witnesses, Pölzl, who died in 1911, was either schizophrenic or mentally handicapped.

=== Norbert Bromberg, Verna Volz Small (1983) ===
Another Hitler pathography was submitted in 1983 by New York psychoanalyst Norbert Bromberg (Albert Einstein College of Medicine) and writer Verna Volz Small. In this book, Hitler's Psychopathology, Bromberg and Small argue that many of Hitler's personal self-manifestations and actions were an expression of a serious personality disorder. Upon examination of his family background, his childhood and youth, and his behaviour as an adult, politician, and ruler, they found many clues in line with the symptoms of narcissistic personality disorder and of borderline personality disorder (see also below). Bromberg and Small's work has been criticised for the unreliable sources that it is based on, and for its speculative treatment of Hitler's presumed homosexuality. (See also: Sexuality of Adolf Hitler, The Pink Swastika.)

The opinion that Hitler had narcissistic personality disorder was not new. Alfred Sleigh explored the topic in 1966.

=== Béla Grunberger, Pierre Dessuant (1997) ===
French psychoanalyst Béla Grunberger and Pierre Dessuant included a section about Hitler into their 1997 book Narcissisme, christianisme, antisémitisme. Like Fromm, Bromberg, and Small, they were particularly interested in Hitler's narcissism, which they tried to trace by a detailed interpretation of Hitler's alleged sexual practices and constipation problems.

=== George Victor (1999) ===
Psychotherapist George Victor had special interest in Hitler's antisemitism. In his 1999 book Hitler: The Pathology of Evil, he assumed that Hitler was not only obsessed with a hatred of Jews, but with self-hatred, too, and that he had a serious borderline personality disorder. Victor found that all these problems had their origin in the abuse that he experienced as a child by his father – who, as he believed, was of Jewish descent. (See also Alois Hitler#Biological father.)

== Post-traumatic stress disorder ==
It is generally undisputed that Hitler had formative experiences as a frontline soldier in World War I. In the early 2000s, psychologists considered that at least some of his psychopathology may be attributed to war trauma.

=== Theodore Dorpat (2003) ===
In 2003, Theodore Dorpat, a resident psychiatrist in Seattle, published his book Wounded Monster in which he credited Hitler with complex post-traumatic stress disorder. He assumed that Hitler not only experienced war trauma, but – due to physical and mental abuse by Hitler's father and the parental failure of his depressed mother – chronic childhood trauma, as well. Dorpat is convinced that Hitler showed signs of this disturbance at the age of 11. According to Dorpat, many of Hitler's personality traits – such as his volatility, his malice, the sadomasochistic nature of his relationships, his human indifference, and his avoidance of shame – can be traced back to trauma.

In the same year, above-mentioned German psychologist Manfred Koch-Hillebrecht came forward with the assumption that Hitler had post-traumatic stress disorder from his war experiences.

=== Gerhard Vinnai (2004) ===
In 2004, social psychologist Gerhard Vinnai (University of Bremen), came to similar conclusions. When writing his work Hitler – Scheitern und Vernichtungswut (2004; "Hitler – Failing and rage of destruction"), Vinnai had a psychoanalytic point of departure. He first subjected Hitler's book Mein Kampf to an in-depth psychological interpretation, and tried to reconstruct how Hitler had processed his experiences in World War I against the background of his childhood and youth.

Similar to Dorpat, Vinnai explains the destructive potential in Hitler's psyche not so much as a result of early childhood experiences, but due to trauma that Hitler had experienced as a soldier in World War I. Not only Hitler, but a substantial part of the German population was affected by such war trauma. Vinnai then leaves the psychoanalytical discourse and comments on social psychological questions, such as how Hitler's political world view could have emerged from his trauma, and how this could appeal to large numbers of people.

In 2007, the above mentioned authors Coolidge, Davis, and Segal, too, assumed that Hitler had had post-traumatic stress disorder.

== Psychoactive drug use ==
Hitler regularly consumed methamphetamine, barbiturates, amphetamine, opiates, and cocaine. In 2015, Norman Ohler published a work Der totale Rausch ("The Total Rush"), translated in 2016 as Blitzed: Drugs in Nazi Germany, in which he claims that all of Hitler's irrational behaviour can be attributed to his excessive drug use. Helena Barop, who reviewed the book in Die Zeit, wrote that Ohler's account is not based on solid research.

== Minority opinions ==
=== Abnormal brain lateralisation: Colin Martindale, Nancy Hasenfus, Dwight Hines (1976) ===
In a 1976 published essay, psychiatrists Colin Martindale, Nancy Hasenfus, and Dwight Hines (University of Maine) suggested that Hitler had had a sub-function of the left hemisphere of the brain. They referred to the tremor of his left limbs, his tendency for leftward eye movements, and the alleged missing of the left testicle. They believed that Hitler's behaviour was dominated by his right cerebral hemisphere, a situation that resulted in symptoms such as a tendency to the irrational, auditory hallucinations, and uncontrolled outbursts. Martindale, Hasenfus, and Hines even suspected that the dominance of the right hemisphere contributed to the two basic elements of Hitler's political ideology: antisemitism and Lebensraum ideology.

=== Schizotypal personality disorder: Robert G. L. Waite (1977) ===
Robert G. L. Waite, a psychohistorian at Williams College, worked towards an interdisciplinary exploration of Nazism from 1949, combining historiographical and psychoanalytic methods. In 1977, he published his study The Psychopathic God in which he took the view that Hitler's career can not be understood without considering his pathological personality. Waite assumed that Hitler had schizotypal personality disorder, a condition that at that time was contained in the definition of "borderline personality disorder".

The term received its present meaning at the end of the 1970s. Until then, "borderline personality disorder" referred to a broader set of disorders in the border area of neurosis and schizophrenia, for which Gregory Zilboorg had also coined the term "ambulatory schizophrenia". As cues that Hitler had this condition, Waite specified Hitler's Oedipus complex, his infantile phantasy, his volatile inconsistency, and his alleged coprophilia and urolagnia. Waite's view partially corresponds with that of Vienna psychiatrist and Buchenwald survivor Ernest A. Rappaport, who already in 1975 had called Hitler an "ambulatory schizophrenic".

=== Dangerous leader disorder: John D. Mayer (1993) ===
In 1993, personality psychologist John D. Mayer (University of New Hampshire) published an essay in which he suggested an independent psychiatric category for destructive personalities like Hitler: A dangerous leader disorder (DLD). Mayer identified three groups of symptomatic behavioral singularities: 1. indifference (becoming manifest for example in murder of opponents, family members or citizens, or in genocide); 2. intolerance (practicing press censorship, running a secret police, or condoning torture); 3. self-aggrandisement (self-assessment as a "unifier" of a people, overestimation of own military power, identification with religion or nationalism, or proclamation of a "grand plan"). Mayer compared Hitler to Stalin and Saddam Hussein. The stated aim of this proposition of a psychiatric categorisation was to provide the international community with a diagnostic instrument which would make it easier to recognise dangerous leader personalities in mutual consensus and to take action against them.

=== Bipolar disorder: Jablow Hershman, Julian Lieb (1994) ===
In 1994, writer Jablow Hershman and psychiatrist Julian Lieb published their joint book A Brotherhood of Tyrants. Based on known Hitler biographies, they developed the hypothesis that Hitler – just like Napoleon Bonaparte and Stalin – had bipolar disorder, which drove him to enter politics and become a dictator.

=== Autism spectrum disorder: Michael Fitzgerald (2004) ===
Michael Fitzgerald, a professor of child and adolescent psychiatry, published the anthology Autism and Creativity, in which he classified Hitler as an "autistic psychopath" based on a painstaking review of Hitler's behavioural idiosyncrasies. Autistic psychopathy is a term that Austrian physician Hans Asperger coined in 1944 in order to label the clinical condition that was later named after him: Asperger syndrome, which is not related to psychopathy in the modern sense of an antisocial personality disorder. Fitzgerald appraised many of Hitler's publicly known traits as autistic, particularly his various fixations, his lifeless gaze, his social awkwardness, his lack of personal friendships, and his tendency toward monologue-like speeches, which, according to Fitzgerald, resulted from an inability to have real conversations.

== DNA analysis ==
In 2025, blood from the sofa where Hitler died underwent DNA analysis. Hitler's polygenic score was in the top 1% for autism, bipolar, and schizophrenia – though such indexing is not diagnostic.

== Critique ==
Some authors have described Hitler as a cynical manipulator or a fanatic, but denied that he was seriously mentally disturbed. Among them are British historians Ian Kershaw, Hugh Trevor-Roper, Alan Bullock, and A. J. P. Taylor, and, more recently, German psychiatrist Manfred Lütz. Kershaw has concluded that Hitler had no major psychotic disorders and was not clinically insane. American psychologist Glenn D. Walters wrote in 2000: "Much of the debate about Hitler's long-term mental health is probably questionable, because even if he had suffered from significant psychiatric problems, he attained the supreme power in Germany rather in spite of these difficulties than through them."

=== Erik H. Erikson (1950) ===
Psychoanalyst and developmental psychologist Erik Erikson included a chapter about Hitler in his 1950 book, Childhood and Society. Erikson referred to Hitler as an "histrionic and hysterical adventurer" and believed there was evidence of an undissolved Oedipus complex in his self-portrayals. Nonetheless, he believed that Hitler was such an actor that his self-expression could not be measured with conventional diagnostic tools. Although Hitler had possibly been showing certain psychopathology, he dealt with this in an extremely controlled fashion and utilised it purposefully.

=== Terry L. Brink (1974) ===
Terry Brink, a student of Alfred Adler, published an essay The case of Hitler (1975) in which he, similar to the above-mentioned authors, concluded that after a conscientious evaluation of all records there is not sufficient evidence that Hitler had a mental disorder. Many of Hitler's behaviours must be understood as attempts to overcome a difficult childhood. However, many of the documents and statements that have been quoted in order to prove a mental illness were to be considered untrustworthy. Too strong consideration has been given, for example, to Allied propaganda and to fabrications of people who have tried to distance themselves from Hitler for personal reasons.

=== Frederick Redlich (1998) ===
One of the most comprehensive Hitler pathographies comes from neurologist and psychiatrist Frederick Redlich. Redlich, who emigrated from Austria in 1938 to the U.S., is considered one of the founders of American social psychiatry. In his 1998 published work Hitler: Diagnosis of a Destructive Prophet, on which he worked for 13 years, Redlich came to believe that Hitler had shown enough paranoia and defence mechanisms in order to "fill a psychiatric textbook with it", but that he was probably not mentally disturbed. Hitler's paranoid beliefs "could be seen as symptoms of a mental disorder, but the largest part of the personality worked normal". In other words, Hitler "knew what he was doing and he did it with pride and enthusiasm".

=== Hans-Joachim Neumann, Henrik Eberle (2009) ===
In 2009, the diaries of Theodor Morell among others – physician Hans-Joachim Neumann and historian Henrik Eberle were published in their joint book War Hitler krank? ("Was Hitler sick?"), in which they concluded after 2 years of study: "For a medically objectified mental illness of Hitler there is no evidence".
