= Eduard Bloch =

Austrian physician (1872–1945)

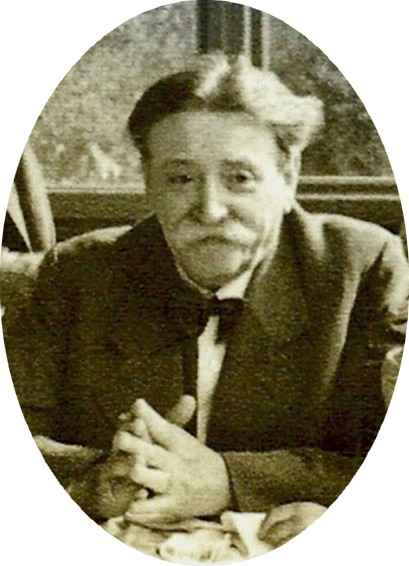
- Bloch in 1926
- Born: 30 January 1872; Podhrad, Bohemia, Austria-Hungary
- Died: 1 June 1945 (aged 73); New York City, New York, U.S.
- Resting place: Beth David Cemetery
- Education: Charles University
- Occupation: Doctor
- Known for: Childhood doctor to Adolf Hitler

Eduard Bloch (30 January 1872 – 1 June 1945) was an Austrian physician practicing in Linz. Born to a Jewish family of Czechoslovak origin, Bloch was the family doctor of Adolf Hitler and his family until 1907. Bloch oversaw the treatment of Hitler's mother, Klara, when she was dying of breast cancer, charging the family very little, to sometimes nothing, for her treatment.

Following the German annexation of Austria in 1938, Hitler described him as an Edeljude ('noble Jew'), and bestowed Gestapo protection on him in the midst of Kristallnacht and the escalation of anti-Jewish sentiment in Germany. Hitler allowed Bloch to emigrate to the United States, where he lived until his death in 1945, succumbing to stomach cancer.

== Biography ==
Eduard Bloch was born on 30 January 1872 in Podhrad, Bohemia, Austria-Hungary (present-day Hluboká nad Vltavou, Czech Republic). He studied medicine in Prague at Charles University and then served as a medical officer in the Austrian army. He was stationed in Linz from 1899 until his discharge in 1901, at which point he opened a private practice there. His practice was in the baroque house at 12 Landstrasse, where he also lived with his family: his wife, Emilie (née Kafka) and their daughter Trude, born in 1903. According to Linz's future mayor Ernst Koref, Bloch was held in high regard, particularly among the lower and indigent social classes.

=== Hitler's family doctor ===
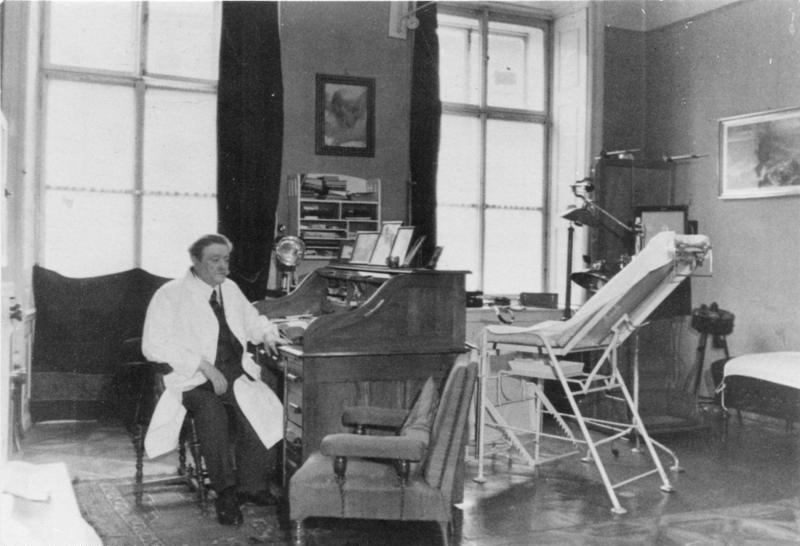
Bloch in his clinic in Linz, c. 1938

The first member of the Hitler family Bloch saw was Adolf. In 1904, Adolf Hitler had become seriously ill and was bedridden due to a serious lung ailment. Due to this, he was allowed to abandon his school career and return home. However, after checking Hitler's files, Bloch later maintained that he had treated the young man for only minor ailments – cold or tonsillitis – and that Hitler had been neither robust nor sickly. He also stated that Hitler did not have any illness whatsoever, let alone a lung disease.

In 1907, Hitler's mother, Klara Hitler, was diagnosed with breast cancer. She died on 21 December after intense suffering involving daily medication with iodoform, a foul-smelling and painful corrosive treatment typically used at the time and administered by Bloch. Because of the poor economic situation of the Hitler family, Bloch charged reduced prices, sometimes taking no fee at all. This showed in 1908, when Hitler wrote Bloch a postcard assuring him of his gratitude and reverence, which he expressed with handmade gifts.

=== Emigration ===
After Germany's annexation of Austria in March 1938 (Anschluss), life became harder for Austrian Jews. After Bloch's medical practice was closed on 1 October 1938, his daughter and son-in-law emigrated overseas. The 66-year-old Bloch then wrote a letter to Hitler asking for help and was as a consequence put under special protection by the Gestapo. He was the only Jew in Linz with this status. Bloch stayed in his house with his wife undisturbed until the formalities for his emigration from the Third Reich and immigration to the United States were completed. Without any interference from the authorities, they were able to sell their family home at market value, highly unusual with the distress sales of emigrating Jews at the time and Nazi expropriation of Jewish assets through the Reich Flight Tax. Moreover, the Blochs were allowed to take the equivalent of 16 ℛ︁ℳ︁, equivalent to €71 in 2021, out of the country; the usual amount allowed to Jews was a mere 10 ℛ︁ℳ︁, equivalent to €44 in 2021.

In 1940, Bloch immigrated to the US and settled in the Bronx, New York City but was no longer able to practice medicine because his medical degree from Austria-Hungary was not recognised.

=== Death ===
He died of stomach cancer in 1945 at age 73, barely a month after Hitler's death.

== See also ==
- Health of Adolf Hitler
- Honorary Aryan
- Theodor Morell
- Werner Haase

== Sources ==
- Álvarez, Jorge (April 3, 2020). "Eduard Bloch, the Jewish doctor whom Hitler helped to leave Germany in 1940". LBV Magazine English Edition.
- Cowley, Jason (October 1, 2002). "The Search for Dr Bloch". Archived from the original on July 2, 2017.
- Hamann, Brigitte (2008). Hitlers Edeljude: Das Leben des Armenarztes Eduard Bloch (in German). Munich: Piper Verlag. ISBN 9783492258456.
- "Holocaust Misconceptions". Illinois Holocaust Museum and Education Center.
- Langer, Walter C. (1972). The Mind of Adolf Hitler. New York.
- Lehrer, Steven (2000). Wannsee House and the Holocaust. McFarland. ISBN 978-0-7864-0792-7.
- Lehrer, Steven (2002). Hitler Sites: A City-by-city Guidebook (Austria, Germany, France, United States). McFarland. ISBN 0-7864-1045-0.
- "Hitler's Noble Jew: The Life of Doctor Eduard Bloch". New Books in German. 2008.

== General references ==
- Bloch, Eduard (1941). "My Patient Hitler" (PDF). Collier's Weekly. No. March 15–22. Archived from the original (PDF) on October 13, 2016.
- Bloch, Eduard (March 5, 1943). "Interview With Dr. Eduard Bloch" (Interview). Interviewed by Office of Strategic Services. Archived from the original on February 5, 2012. Report on which Hitler Source Book is based.
- Bloch, Eduard (2002). Grenville, J. A. S.; Gross, Raphael (eds.). "The Autobiography of Obermedizinalrat Eduard Bloch". The Leo Baeck Institute Year Book (XLVII). Leo Baeck Institute.
- Hamann, Brigitte (1999). Hitler's Vienna: A Dictator's Apprenticeship. Oxford University Press. ISBN 0-19-514053-2.
