= The Hitler Book =

2005 book edited by Matthias Uhl and Henrik Eberle

The Hitler Book: The Secret Dossier Prepared for Stalin
- Cover of the first edition
- Editors: Matthias Uhl; Henrik Eberle
- Original title: Das Buch Hitler
- Translator: Giles MacDonogh
- Language: German
- Publisher: Verlagsgruppe Lübbe
- Publication date: 2005
- Publication place: Germany
- English publication date: 2005
- Media type: Print

The Hitler Book: The Secret Dossier Prepared for Stalin (German: Das Buch Hitler) is the 2005 publication of a long-secret Soviet report on the life of Adolf Hitler written at the behest of Joseph Stalin. It was edited and translated into German by Matthias Uhl and Henrik Eberle.

== The initial Soviet report ==
The project that grew into the compilation of The Hitler Book began shortly after the end of World War II in Europe. Joseph Stalin had doubted the official story that Adolf Hitler had indeed committed suicide, personally holding that Hitler had fled and claiming that the Western Allies had granted him political asylum.

At the end of 1945, Stalin ordered the NKVD (the People's Commissariat of Internal Affairs—a precursor to the KGB) to investigate the circumstances of Hitler's supposed death and to reconstruct the last days of April 1945 inside the Führerbunker. The NKVD codenamed this project "Operation Myth". People's Commissar Sergei Kruglov was in charge of this investigation, while the actual writing of the final report was done by the security service officers Fyodor Parparov and Igor Saleyev.

In the immediate aftermath of Hitler's suicide on 30 April 1945, the forces of the Soviet Union had immediate access to the German Reich Chancellery and the Führerbunker in Berlin. Their investigation went on for almost four years and by the time it was completed, its scope had widened from simply researching the circumstances of Hitler's death into a detailed report on Hitler's life from 1933 to 1945. The NKVD researchers had access to large numbers of documents confiscated from Hitler's headquarters and living quarters, and also were able to question many Nazis who had known Hitler personally. These included Heinz Linge, Hitler's personal assistant and valet, and Otto Günsche, Hitler's Schutzstaffel adjutant. Both men were imprisoned in Soviet gulags during the writing of the report and were subjected to "extensive, often gruelling interrogation". For instance, the NKVD held Linge in a solitary cell crawling with bugs and subjected him to repeated whippings and other humiliating tortures.

The final report, amounting to 413 typed pages, was presented to Stalin on 29 December 1949.

== Discovery by Western historians ==
During the reign of Nikita Khrushchev, the report was classified as "document no. 462a," with no annotation or description of its unique contents. Therefore, even though Western historians were allowed access into the archives of the former Soviet Union starting in 1991, this "document no. 462a" lay undiscovered, due to its bland and innocuous title, for many years. Researchers from the Institute for Contemporary History in Munich, including Matthias Uhl and Henrik Eberle, "discovered" the report in the Communist Party Archives that became The Hitler Book in 2005. The volume was first translated and published in German by Henrik Eberle and Matthias Uhl, and then immediately presented in an English version, with a translation by Giles MacDonogh. It has now been published in more than thirty languages.

== Criticism ==
This work provides insight into the inner workings of Nazi Germany, but also into the biases of the political system that prepared the volume. The work was written not for a general audience, but exclusively for Stalin. Subsequent historians have pointed out, for instance, that the dossier prepared for Stalin omits the Molotov–Ribbentrop Pact, the subsequent Soviet invasion of Poland (only mentioning Germany's role), events later known as the Holocaust, or any mention of German anti-Jewish policies. After the war, antisemitism in the Soviet Union had reached new heights. Furthermore, the work is based heavily upon firsthand interviews with Linge and Günsche that were conducted under duress and inhumane conditions, thereby undermining the reliability of much of the information.

One journalist's summary of the description of Hitler states that the book "supports the widely held view that Hitler was delusional, irrational and because of his infantile psychological make-up, utterly unable to tolerate any criticism of his own deficiencies". The review by Publishers Weekly reminded readers that the two aides who provided the content for the book "appreciated the [Soviet] regime's need to present Hitler as a degenerate, drug-addicted tool of German imperialist capitalism. Their lives depended on how well they understood that unwritten imperative."
