= The Mind of Adolf Hitler =

1972 book by Walter Charles Langer

The Mind of Adolf Hitler: The Secret Wartime Report
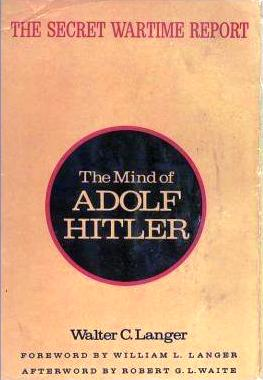
- Cover
- Author: Walter C. Langer
- Subject: Adolf Hitler
- Publisher: Basic Books
- Publication date: 1972
- ISBN: 0-465-04620-7
- Dewey Decimal: 943.086/092/4B
- LC Class: DD247.H5L29

The Mind of Adolf Hitler: The Secret Wartime Report, published in 1972 by Basic Books, is based on a World War II report by psychoanalyst Walter C. Langer which probed the psychology of Adolf Hitler from the available information. The original report was prepared for the United States' Office of Strategic Services (OSS) and submitted in late 1943 or early 1944; it is officially entitled A Psychological Analysis of Adolph Hitler: His Life and Legend. The report is one of two psychoanalytic reports prepared for the OSS during the war in an attempt to assess Hitler's personality; the other is Analysis of the Personality of Adolph Hitler by the psychologist Henry A. Murray who also contributed to Langer's report.

The book contains not only a version of Langer's original report but also a foreword by his brother, historian William L. Langer, who was Chief of Research and Analysis at the OSS during the war, an introduction by Langer himself, and an afterword by the psychoanalytic historian Robert Sherly.L. Waite.

The report made several predictions about Hitler's future which proved to be accurate:

- As the war turns against him, his emotions will intensify and will have outbursts more frequently. His public appearances will become much rarer, because he is unable to face a critical audience.
- There might be an assassination attempt on him by the German aristocracy, the Wehrmacht officers or the Oberkommando der Wehrmacht, because of his superhuman self-confidence in his military judgment.
- There will be no surrender, capitulation, or peace negotiations. The course he will follow will almost certainly be the road to ideological immortality, resulting in the greatest vengeance on a world he despises.
- From what we know of his psychology, the most likely possibility is that he will commit suicide in the event of defeat. It is probably true he has an inordinate fear of death, but possibly being a psychopath he would undoubtedly "screw himself up" into the superman character and perform the deed.

== History of the report ==
The wartime report was commissioned by the head of the OSS, William J. "Wild Bill" Donovan. The research and investigation for it was done in collaboration with three other clinicians – Professor Henry A. Murray of the Harvard Psychological Clinic, Dr. Ernst Kris of the New School for Social Research, and Dr. Bertram D. Lewin of the New York Psychoanalytic Institute – as well as research associates. Langer notes in his introduction to the book that one of the three essentially dropped out of the project because he was too busy with other work, but he gives no names. "He promised, however, to write down his views and conclusions and submit them ... Unfortunately, not a word was ever received from him" although he did apparently confirm to Langer by telephone that he agreed with the diagnosis of Hitler's pathology.

Historian Hans W. Gatzke and others have suggested that Langer borrowed extensively from prior work by Murray without properly crediting him, such as his lurid sexual analysis and his prediction of suicide; Langer has disputed some of the claims although the texts show similarities. In addition, similarities have been noted to perhaps the earliest published psychological profile of Hitler developed by Murray and influential psychologist Gordon Allport for Harvard seminars on 'Civilian Morale' (1941), intended to be distributed to private organisations throughout the US to prepare a consensus for war. The Harvard University Archives register stated that Murray started work on this profile in 1938 upon request from the Roosevelt administration.

The Langer report was classified as "Secret" by the OSS, but was eventually declassified in 1968. After receiving some encouragement from fellow scholars, particularly Professor Henderson Braddick of the Department of International Relations at Lehigh University, Langer decided to publish the report in book form. The original report is in the public domain and is available on the Internet on a number of sites. Numerous substantial unexplained differences were noted by Gatzke, however, between the report as published in 1972 and a separate copy of the 1943/44 report. Gatzke writes "Recent correspondence with the publisher...has revealed that the original [OSS report] manuscript was changed and edited several times by Dr. Langer and others, both in 1943 and again before publication.

== Content and conclusions ==
The report used many sources to profile Hitler, including a number of informants, including Hitler's nephew, William Patrick Hitler, his family physician, Dr. Eduard Bloch, Ernst Hanfstaengl, Hermann Rauschning, Princess Stephanie von Hohenlohe, Otto Strasser, Friedlinde Wagner, and Kurt Ludecke. The so-called "Hitler Source Book" which was appended to the wartime report, ran over one thousand pages and was indexed against the report. The groundbreaking study was the pioneer of offender profiling and political psychology, today commonly used by many countries as part of assessing international relations.

In addition to predicting that if defeat for Germany was near, Hitler would most likely choose suicide, Langer's report stated that Hitler was "probably impotent" as far as heterosexual relations were concerned and that there was a possibility that Hitler had participated in a homosexual relationship. The report stated that:

[t]he belief that Hitler is homosexual has probably developed (a) from the fact that he does show so many feminine characteristics, and (b) from the fact that there were so many homosexuals in the Party during the early days and many continue to occupy important positions. It is probably true that Hitler calls Foerster "Bubi", which is a common nickname employed by homosexuals in addressing their partners. This alone, however, is not adequate proof that he has actually indulged in homosexual practices with Foerster, who is known to be a homosexual.

Langer's report also concluded that Hitler loved pornography and masochistic sex, and in particular that he had "coprophagic tendencies or their milder manifestations" in his heterosexual relationships, and masochistically derived "sexual gratification from the act of having a woman urinate or defecate on him."

According to Langer's introduction to the 1972 publication, he and his fellow investigators made a preliminary conclusion from a "survey of the raw material" and "knowledge of Hitler's actions as reported in the news" that Hitler "was, in all probability, a neurotic psychopath" (page 17) (the term "psychopath" was applied prior to the popularization of its modern definition in The Mask of Sanity and likely just refers to being mentally ill, with "neurotic" being the key descriptor). On page 126 the claim is slightly different, and in turn different from the statement in the scan of the original 1943/44 OSS report (pp. 127–128): "There was general [OSS: unanimous] agreement among the collaborators [OSS: four psychoanalysts who have studied the material] that Hitler is probably a neurotic psychopath [OSS: is a hysteric] bordering on schizophrenia [OSS adds: and not a paranoiac as is so frequently supposed]."

The report briefly mentions some claims that a Rothschild fathered Alois Hitler – Adolf's father, who was illegitimate – when Hitler's paternal grandmother, Maria Schicklgruber, supposedly worked as a house servant in Vienna, but concludes "it is not absolutely necessary to assume that he had Jewish blood in his veins in order to make a comprehensive picture of his character with its manifold traits and sentiments. From a purely scientific point of view, therefore, it is sounder not to base our reconstruction on such slim evidence but to seek firmer foundations. Nevertheless, we can leave it as a possibility which requires further verification." Some statements in the report have proven, on further investigation, to be erroneous.

The bibliography of the report contains close to 400 entries.

== Purposes and effects ==
The Langer report was ostensibly an objective analysis of the mind of Adolf Hitler and related aspects of his life and society, based on written material, interviews, psychoanalytic theory and clinical experience. The first words of the OSS report are: "This study is not propagandist in any sense of the term. It represents an attempt to screen the wealth of contradictory, conflicting and unreliable material concerning Hitler into strata which will be helpful to the policy-makers and those who wish to frame a counter-propaganda." The preface further asserts that despite the 'extremely scant and spotty' material for a psychological analysis, one was possible due to their informants knowing Hitler well and their descriptions agreeing relatively well with each other, combined with the writers' own 'clinical experience in dealing with individuals of a similar type'. Ernst Hanfstaengl, a Harvard-educated German businessman who was an intimate of Adolf Hitler and was interviewed for several weeks once returned to the US, has been noted as the likely informant.

Others, however, have suggested that the analysis was intended to be useful for propaganda and "psychological warfare". Historian Bradley F Smith states that Langer's report was known in the OSS as the “spiced-up” version, and that the idea originally came from Fred Oechsner, the chief of the London station of the OSS's Morale Operations Branch.

In a review of The Mind of Adolf Hitler for The Psychoanalytic Quarterly, Martin Waugh concluded that Langer's work is important "because of its value to the historian; because it was a 'first' for this country's intelligence services; and because of the official recognition of psychoanalysis the assignment implied." Historian Gatzke agrees that the original document is of historical interest, but not more due to the unreliability of its descriptions of the evidence and of its interpretations. Regarding the earlier Murray report which fed into the Langer report, psychiatrist Michael Stone states "There's a whole lot of what we would now think of as psychobabble...", including discredited psychoanalytic theories and psychiatric labels used in different ways to today. The dust jacket of the 1972 publication states: "What effect did this astounding secret document have on Allied war policy? That is not yet known. But in the words of Robert G.L. Waite, the distinguished historian [who wrote the afterword], Dr. Langer’s The Mind of Adolf Hitler is, in itself, "fascinating…a significant and suggestive interpretation which no serious student of Hitler will ignore."

== In popular culture ==
- The Military Channel program Inside the Mind of Adolf Hitler is based on The Mind of Adolf Hitler, and dramatised scenes connected to Langer's investigation.

== See also ==
- List of Adolf Hitler books
- Psychopathography of Adolf Hitler

== Sources ==
- Langer, Walter C. (1972) [1943]. The Mind of Adolf Hitler: The Secret Wartime Report. New York: Basic Books. ISBN 978-0-465-04620-1.
