= Albert Forster =

Nazi Gauleiter of Danzig and war criminal (1902–1952)

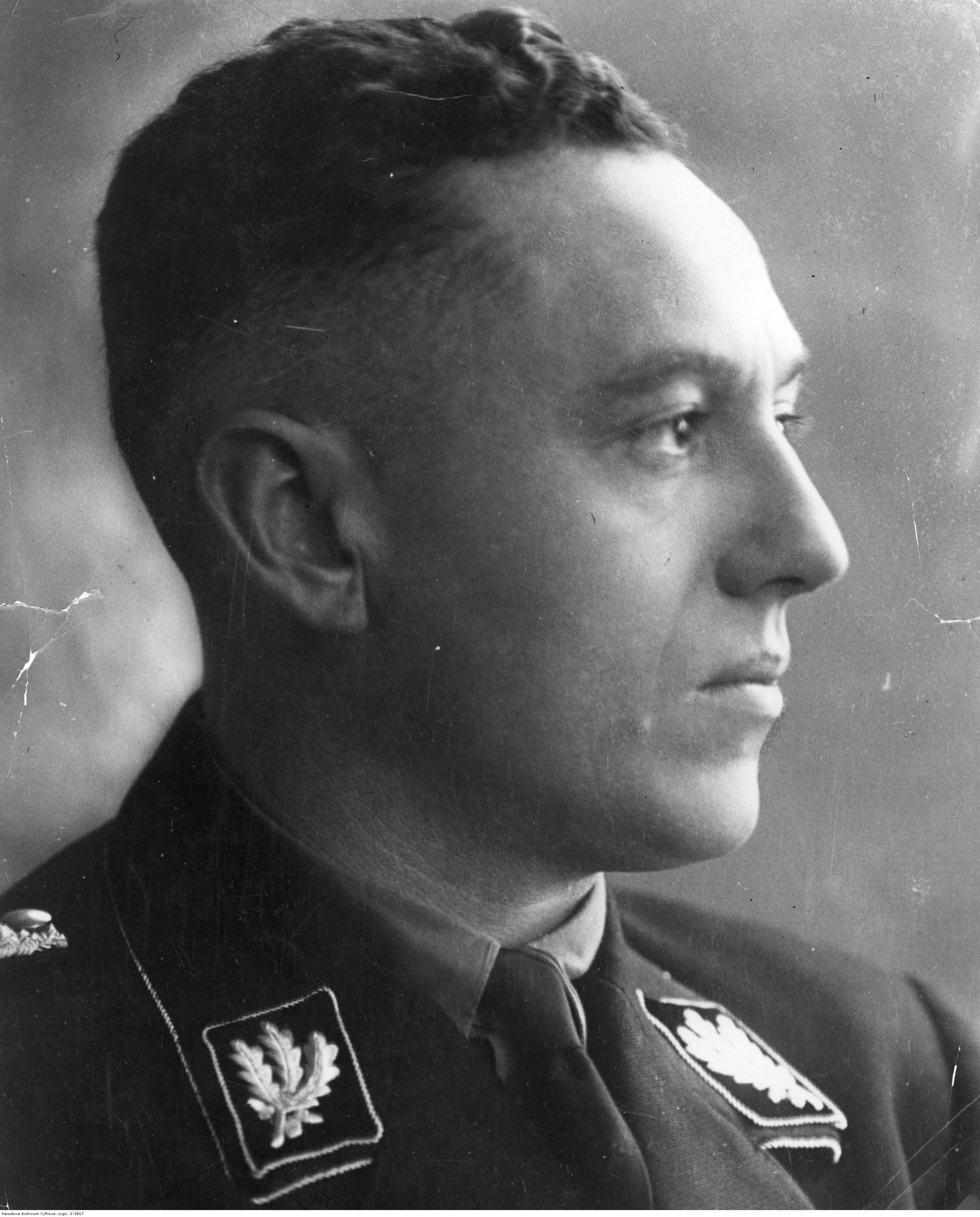
- As SS-Gruppenführer c. 1939

Gauleiter of the Free City of Danzig
- In office 15 October 1930 – 26 October 1939
- Preceded by: Arthur Greiser
- Succeeded by: Position abolished

Head of state of the Free City of Danzig
- In office 23 August 1939 – 1 September 1939
- Preceded by: Arthur Greiser
- Succeeded by: Position abolished

Reichsstatthalter and Gauleiter of Danzig-West Prussia
- In office 26 October 1939 – 27 March 1945
- Appointed by: Adolf Hitler
- Preceded by: Positions established
- Succeeded by: Positions abolished

Personal details
- Born: 26 July 1902 Fürth, Kingdom of Bavaria, German Empire
- Died: 28 February 1952 (aged 49) Mokotów Prison, Warsaw, Republic of Poland
- Cause of death: Execution by hanging
- Party: Nazi Party
- Spouse: Gertrud Deetz (m. 1934)

Military service
- Rank: SS-Obergruppenführer

Albert Maria Forster (26 July 1902 – 28 February 1952) was a German Nazi Party politician, member of the SS and war criminal. During the Second World War, under his administration as the Gauleiter and Reichsstatthalter of Danzig-West Prussia (the other German-annexed section of occupied Poland aside from the Warthegau), the local non-German populations of Poles and Jews were classified as sub-human and subjected to extermination campaigns involving ethnic cleansing, mass murder, and in the case of some Poles with German ancestry, forceful Germanisation. Forster was directly responsible for the extermination of non-Germans and was a strong supporter of Polish genocide, which he had advocated before the war. Forster was tried, convicted and hanged in Warsaw for his crimes, after Germany was defeated.

== Early life ==
The youngest of six children, Albert Maria Forster was born in Fürth on 26 July 1902, where he attended Volksschule and the Humanistisches Gymnasium from 1908 to 1920. He then trained in banking for two years and began working at a Fürth bank in 1922. In November 1923, he joined the Nazi Party, becoming the leader of its local branch in Fürth; he also became a member of the SA at that time. In May 1924 he was dismissed from the bank for his Nazi activities, including antisemitic agitation. Following the Beer Hall Putsch when the Nazi Party was outlawed, he became a member of a Nazi front organization, the Greater German People's Community, and served as its local leader. During this time he was befriended by Julius Streicher, the Party leader of northern Bavaria, and became a part-time journalist for Streicher's weekly antisemitic paper Der Stürmer. He was a spectator of the treason trial of Adolf Hitler, Erich Ludendorff, and eight others putschists from 26 February to 1 April 1924 in the Munich court.

== Nazi Party career ==
=== Franconia ===
Forster was in attendance in Munich when the Nazi Party was refounded by Hitler on 27 February 1925, and he again became the Ortsgruppenleiter (Local Group Leader) in Fürth. He officially rejoined the Party on 5 April 1925 (membership number 1,924); as an early Party member he was considered an Alter Kämpfer and would later be awarded the Golden Party Badge. He soon became a Parteiredner (Party orator) giving speeches throughout the area. On 12 May 1926, he joined the Schutzstaffel (SS), forming and leading the SS Group "Nurnberg-Fürth" in July 1926. From February 1928, Forster was employed as a payment office official by the German National Association of Commercial Employees (Deutschnationaler Handlungsgehilfen-Verband, DHV), a nationalist and anti-Semitic trade union. Forster unsuccessfully sought a seat in the Reichstag at the 20 May 1928 election. However, that year he advanced to Party Bezirksleiter (District Leader) for Middle Franconia, while also retaining his leadership in Fürth; he would continue to hold these positions through December 1929. At the 14 September 1930 election, Forster was elected to the Reichstag from electoral constituency 26, Franconia, the seat he would retain until July 1940. He was made the expert advisor on labor and clerical employee issues to the Nazi Reichstag faction. When elected, he was the youngest deputy in the Reichstag.

=== Free City of Danzig ===
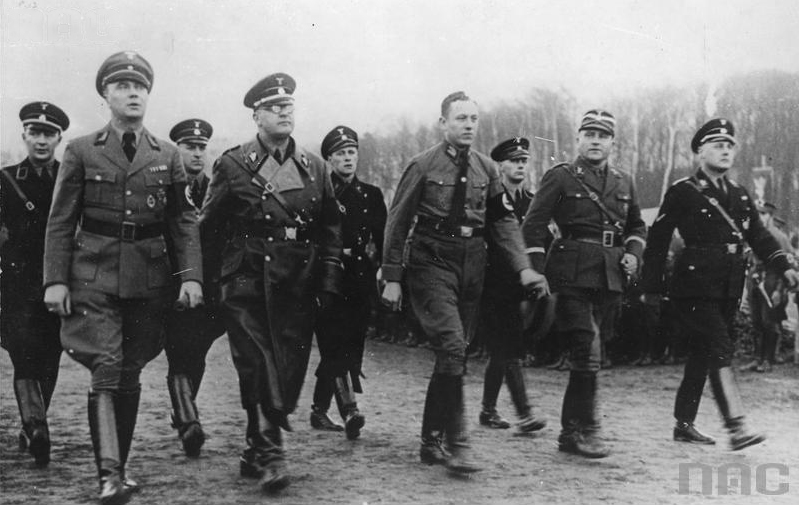
Albert Forster with Arthur Greiser, Erich von dem Bach-Zelewski, Heinrich Hacker and Wilhelm Koppe in the late 1930s

On 15 October 1930, Forster became the Nazi Party's Gauleiter of the Free City of Danzig (now Gdańsk, Poland), replacing Arthur Greiser who then became the Deputy Gauleiter. This touched off a feud between them and Greiser was to remain Forster's lifelong nemesis. Many residents resented Forster as an interloper who had replaced Greiser, a native Danziger. Forster immediately embarked on an aggressive propaganda campaign and membership drive. In November 1930, he became the founder and publisher of the Danziger Beobachter (Danzig Observer). From December 1930 to December 1932, he increased the Danzig Party membership from 1,310 to 9,519, and the local SA from 150 to 1,500 members.

After the Nazi seizure of power, Forster spearheaded the Nazi takeover of Danzig in spring 1933, attaining an absolute majority for the Nazi Party in the Danzig Senate. Hitler rewarded him with the leadership of the DHV on 10 May 1933, making him the head of all clerical employee organizations within the German Labor Front. On 15 September he was appointed to the Prussian State Council and in January 1934, he was made honorary Führer of the 36th SS-Standarte in Danzig. In January 1935, he was named chairman of the Danzig branch of the Nordische Gesellschaft (Nordic Society) charged with strengthening German-Nordic cultural and political cooperation. On 23 January 1936, he became a member of the personal staff of Reichsführer-SS Heinrich Himmler.

In 1937 Forster boasted about his fight against communists and other "subhumans".

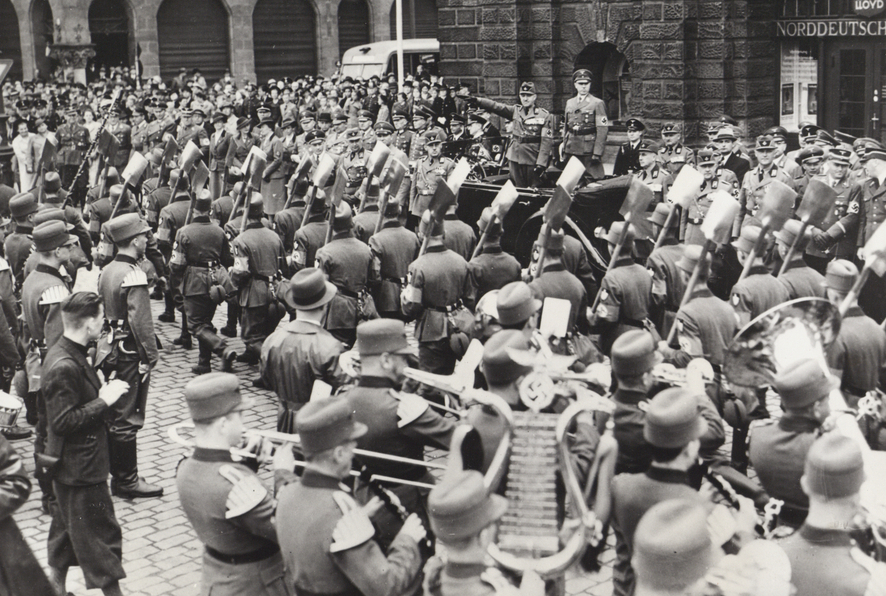
Albert Forster (right, standing in car beside the Reich Labour Service leader Konstantin Hierl saluting), reviewing a parade during the festival of the Danzig Labour Service on 4 June 1939.

In 1939, following orders from Berlin, Forster led the agitation in Danzig to step up pressure for annexation by Nazi Germany and proclaimed that in future "Poland will be only a dream". On 23 August Forster replaced Greiser as Danzig's head of state. The Danzig issue was one of the pretexts used for the Nazi invasion of Poland in 1939. He was hateful of Jews whom he called "dirty and slippery race" and he expressed his desire to control parts of Poland after Poles would be expelled from them.

Before World War II, Forster had tried and failed to gain control over the organisation of the irredentist activities of the ethnic German population in the Polish Corridor neighbouring Freie Stadt Danzig, which was created in 1920 by the Treaty of Versailles; rather it was the SS-dominated Volksdeutsche Mittelstelle that won control. With Forster and Himmler engaged in a power struggle, this rendered the (ethnic) Germans suspicious of Forster. When these territories were annexed after the Invasion of Poland and they became Reichsgau Danzig – West Prussia, Forster's distrust of the local Nazi leaders led him to deny them political power. Forster filled all the significant positions with his allies from the pre-war Free City of Danzig. This snub provoked bitterness among the local Germans in addition to Forster's Germanisation policies, which denied them a higher status than local Poles.

In May 1934 Forster married Gertrud Deetz. The wedding took place in the Berlin chancellery, with Hitler and Rudolf Hess as witnesses and wedding guests. A 1943–44 OSS report on Hitler titled Analysis of the Personality of Adolph Hitler by psychoanalyst Walter C. Langer asserts that Forster "is known to be a homosexual" and was addressed by Hitler as "Bubi" (from the German Bube), a common term of affection among German homosexuals of the era.

=== World War II ===
Immediately following the German invasion of Poland, Forster on 8 September was appointed Chief of Civil Administration in the military district of Danzig-West Prussia, which subsequently was annexed to the German Reich on 8 October 1939. The military administration ended and he was then appointed Gauleiter of the newly created Reichsgau Danzig-West Prussia on 21 October. At the same time, he was also named Reichsstatthalter (Reich Governor) of the new territory, thereby uniting under his control the highest party and governmental offices in his jurisdiction. Additionally, he was appointed Reich Defense Commissioner of the newly established Wehrkreis (Military District) XX, consisting of the new Reichsgau. On 7 July 1940 he became a member of the Reichstag as a representative for Danzig-West Prussia and would retain this seat until the end of the Nazi regime. A member of the SS since 1926, Forster was promoted to SS-Obergruppenführer on 31 December 1941. In September 1944, he was given command of the Volkssturm forces in his Reichsgau. He would retain these posts until fleeing Danzig on 27 March 1945 ahead of the invading Soviet Red Army forces.

=== Extermination and ethnic cleansing ===
Adolf Hitler instructed the Gauleiters, namely Forster and his rival Arthur Greiser, Gauleiter in the Warthegau, to Germanise the area, promising that "There would be no questions asked" about how this "Germanisation" was to be accomplished. Forster's goal was to make the area fully Germanised within ten years, and he was directly responsible for extermination policy in the region.

Forster was directly responsible for the extermination of non-Germans in Danzig-West Prussia. He personally believed in the need to engage in genocide of Poles and stated that, "We have to exterminate this nation, starting from the cradle" and declared that Poles and Jews were not human.

Around 70 camps were set up for Polish people in Pomerania where they were subjected to murder, torture and, in the case of women and girls, rape before being executed. Between the 10th and 15 September, Forster organised a meeting of top Nazi officials in his region and ordered the immediate removal of all "dangerous" Poles, all Jews, and all Polish clergy. In some cases Forster ordered executions himself. On the 19th of October he reprimanded Nazi officials in the city of Grudziadz for not "spilling enough Polish blood."

The total number of victims of what Christopher Browning calls an "orgy of murder and deportation" cannot be precisely estimated. Forster reported that 87,000 people had been "evacuated" from the region by February 1940.

==== Piaśnica ====
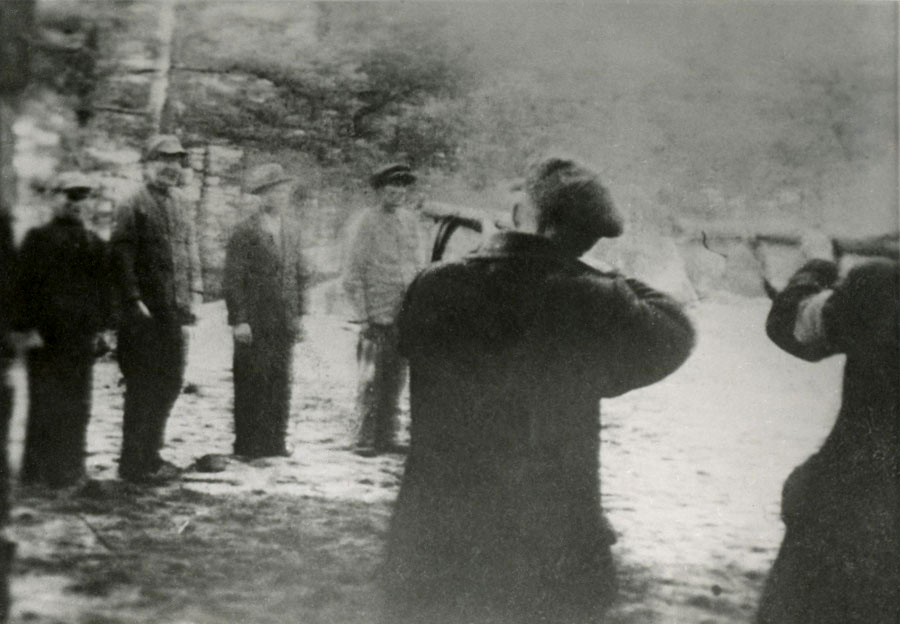
Mass execution in Piaśnica

Forster was one of those responsible for the mass murders in Piaśnica, where approximately 12,000 to 16,000 Poles, Jews, Czechs, Kashubians and even Germans were killed in the winter of 1939–1940. Forster personally encouraged such violence; in a speech at the Prusinski Hotel in Wejherowo he incited ethnic Germans to attack Poles by saying "We have to eliminate the lice-ridden Poles, starting with those in the cradle. In your hands I give the fate of the Poles; you can do with them what you want". The crowd gathered before the hotel chanted "Kill the Polish dogs!" and "Death to the Poles". The Selbstschutz later participated in the massacres as Piaśnica. In 1946 a Polish National Tribunal in Gdańsk held Forster responsible for the murders at Piasnica.

==== Role in the Jewish Holocaust ====
Forster at the outbreak of the war declared that "Jews are not humans, and must be eradicated like vermin...mercy towards Jews is reprehensible. Any means of destruction of Jews is desirable." Jews were killed locally or deported to the General Government. By November 1939 Danzig-West Prussia was declared "Judenfrei". It is estimated that up to 30,000 Jews from Polish areas annexed by Nazi Germany in Pomerania and attached to Danzig-West Prussia were murdered during the war.

==== Germanisation policies ====
The terror policy instituted by Forster offered only two possibilities to the Polish population: extermination or Germanisation, genocide and forced assimilation. At the start of the war Forster planned ethnic cleansing from his Gau of all Poles originating from Congress Poland and all Jews by February 1940, but unforeseen problems with agriculture workers and the inadequate character of German settlers forced him to revise his policies. Forster was willing to accept as Germans any and all Poles who claimed to have "German blood": all Poles who stated to Party investigators that they had German ancestry were taken at face value with no documentation required. Refusal of German identity was punishable by deportation to the General Government or imprisonment in a concentration camp. In some cases whole settlements were classed German to meet Forster's quotas. Practical issues like food production could influence Forster's expulsion decisions.

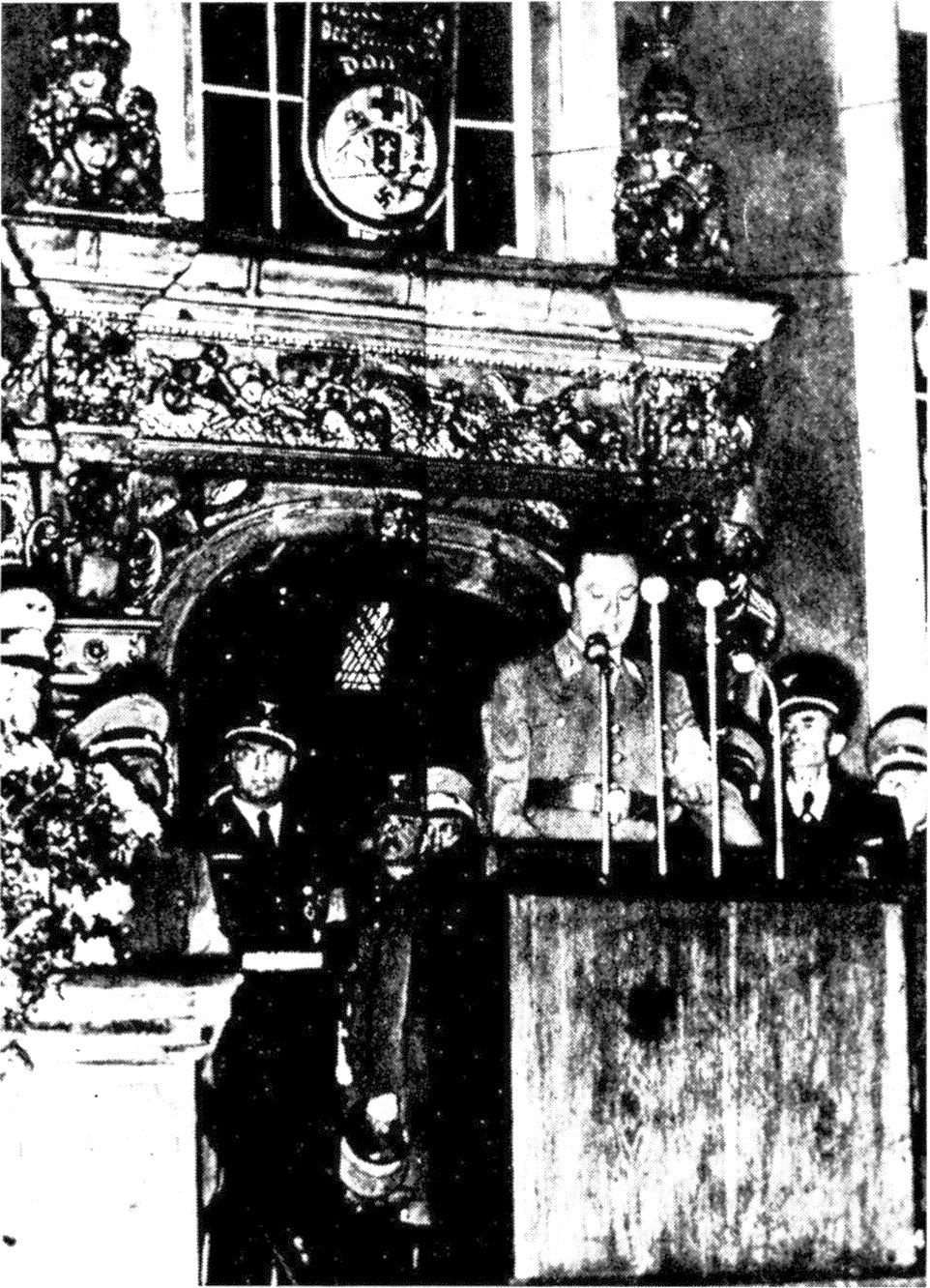
Albert Forster making a speech in 1939

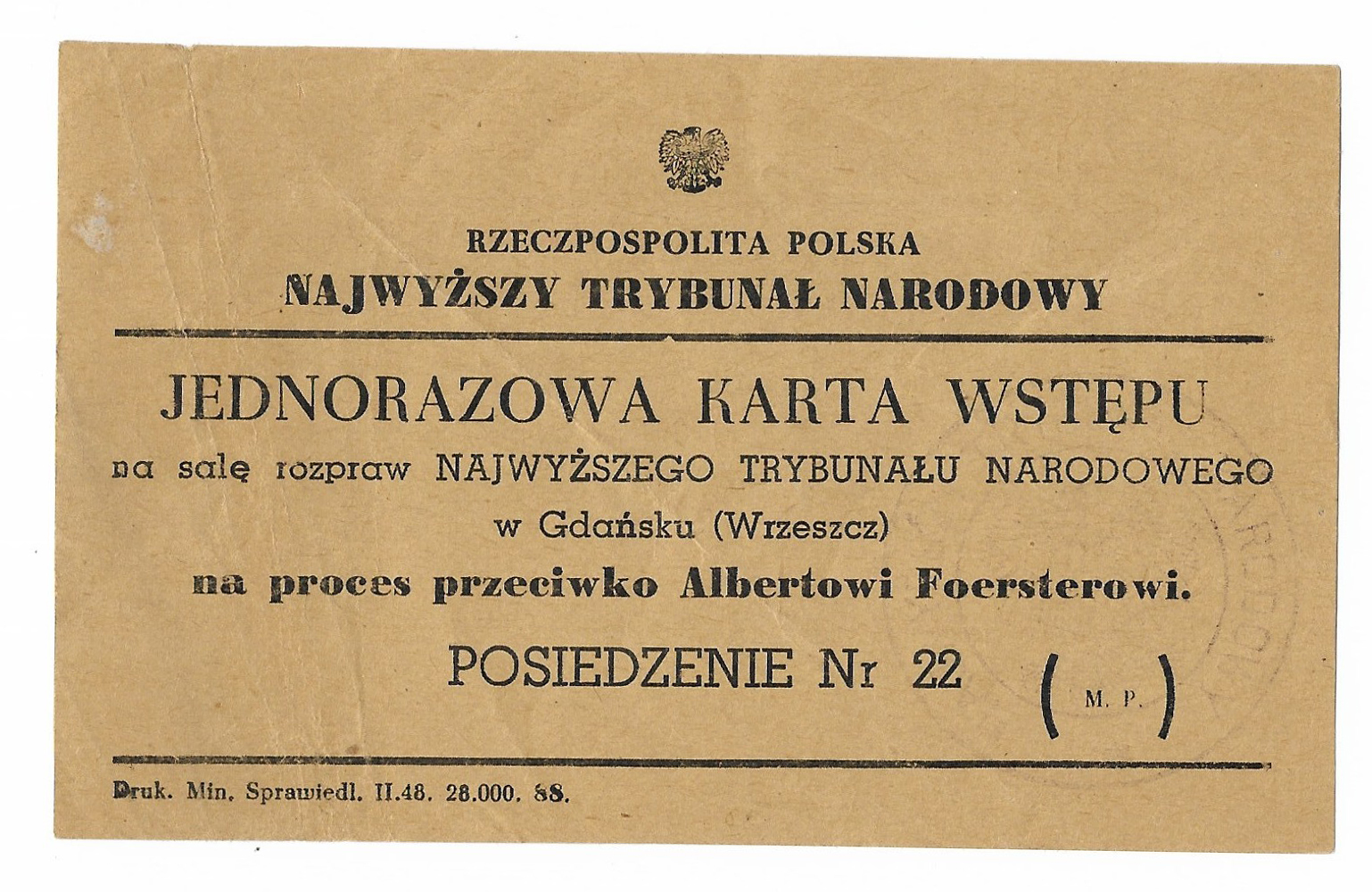
1948 admission card to the trial of Albert Forster.

Arthur Greiser complained to Heinrich Himmler, Reich Commissioner for the Strengthening of Germandom, that Forster's assimilation policy was against Nazi racial theory. When Himmler approached Forster over this issue, Forster simply ignored him, realizing that Hitler allowed each Gauleiter to run his area as he saw fit. Greiser and Himmler then complained to Hitler that thousands of Poles were being classified as Germans, but Hitler told them to sort out their problems with Forster on their own. Himmler's attempts to cajole Forster met with resentment and contempt. In a discussion with Richard Hildebrandt, Forster scoffed, "If I looked like Himmler, I wouldn't talk about race."

As a result, two-thirds of the ethnic Polish population of Forster's Gau was classed as German under the Deutsche Volksliste.

Although far fewer Poles would be removed from Danzig-West Prussia than in the neighbouring Warthegau it is estimated that by the end of the war, up to 60,000 people had been murdered in the region and between 35,000 and 170,000 expelled. Forster himself reported that 87,000 people had been "evacuated" from the region by February 1940.

==== Conflict with SS and colonisation policies ====
Forster's conflict with the SS soured his attitude toward ethnic German refugees. During the war, hundreds of thousands of ethnic Germans were moved by Nazi-Soviet agreement from the Soviet Union into Poland and used as colonists in Nazi-occupied Poland. While Greiser did all he could to accommodate them in his Reichsgau, Forster viewed them with hostility, claiming that his region needed young farmers while the refugees were old and urbanised. He initially refused to admit any of them. When a ship bearing several thousand ethnic Germans from the Baltic states arrived at Danzig, he refused them entry unless Himmler promised that they would not be settled in Danzig-West Prussia but proceed immediately elsewhere, an assurance that Himmler could not provide. It was only following a lengthy telephone consultation with the desperate Himmler that Forster allowed the passengers to disembark, on the understanding that their stay would be temporary, though most did not ultimately leave. In time he had to relent, and by June 1944, 53,258 colonists had settled in Danzig-West Prussia, though far fewer than the 421,780 settled in the Warthegau. One of Forster's motives may have been that his Germanization policies left less free land and housing than Greiser's mass expulsions, although his perception of the ethnic German refugees as wards of the SS clearly played in his attitude.

== Trial and death ==
At the end of the war, Forster took refuge in the British Occupation Zone of Germany. The British handed him over to the Republic of Poland in May 1945.

In May 1948, Forster was condemned to death by the Polish Supreme National Tribunal for war crimes and crimes against humanity, with his sentence deferred. Forster was moved from Gdańsk to Mokotów Prison in Warsaw, where he was hanged on 28 February 1952. His wife, who had not heard from him since 1949, was informed of his death in 1954.

== See also ==
- List SS-Obergruppenführer
