= Giles MacDonogh =

British writer, historian and translator (born 1955)

Giles MacDonogh (born 1955) is a British writer, historian and translator.

== Life ==
MacDonogh has worked as a journalist, most notably for the Financial Times (1988–2003), where he covered food, drink and a variety of other subjects. He has also contributed to most of the other important British newspapers, and is a regular contributor to The Times. As an historian, MacDonogh concentrates on central Europe, principally Germany.

He was educated at the City of London School and Balliol College, Oxford, where he read modern history. He later carried out historical research at the École pratique des hautes études in Paris.

MacDonogh is the author of fourteen books, chiefly about German history; he has also written about gastronomy and wine. In 1988 he won a Glenfiddich Special Award for his first book, A Palate in Revolution (Robin Clark) and was shortlisted for the André Simon Award. His books have been translated into French, Italian, Bulgarian, German, Chinese, Slovak, Spanish, Russian and Polish.

Reviewing 1938: Hitler’s Gamble in Spectator Magazine, Graham Stewart said: "Giles MacDonogh has repeatedly shown himself to be in the front rank of British scholars of German history. The depth of his human understanding, the judiciousness of his pickings from source material and the quality of his writing make this book at once gripping and grave."

MacDonogh criticised the 2004 German film Downfall for sympathetic portrayals of Wilhelm Mohnke and Ernst-Günther Schenck. Mohnke was rumoured, but never proven, to have ordered the execution of a group of British POWs in the Wormhoudt massacre near Dunkirk in 1940, while Schenck's experiments with medicinal plants in 1938 allegedly led to the deaths of a number of concentration camp prisoners. In response, the film's director stated he did his own research and did not find the allegations as to Schenck convincing. Mohnke strongly denied the accusations against him, telling historian Thomas Fischer, "I issued no orders not to take English prisoners or to execute prisoners."

His latest book is The Great Battles (2010).

== Bibliography ==
=== Works ===
- A Palate in Revolution: Grimod de La Reyniere and the Almanach des Gourmands, Robin Clark (1987), ISBN 0-86072-109-4
- A Good German: Adam von Trott zu Solz ((the German Resistance leader executed for his part in the failed 1944 assassination attempt against Hitler), Quartet (1989), ISBN 0-7043-2730-9
- Brillat-Savarin: The Judge and His Stomach (A Life of the Great French Gastronome, John Murray (1992), ISBN 0-7195-4711-3
- Syrah, Grenach and Mourvèdre (Grape Guides to Varieties), Viking (1992), ISBN 0-670-82588-3
- The Wine and Food of Austria, Mitchell-Beazley (1992), ISBN 0-85533-944-6
- Prussia: The Perversion of an Idea, Sinclair-Stevenson (1994) ISBN 1-85619-267-9
- Berlin: A Portrait of Its History, Politics, Architecture, and Society, Sinclair-Stevenson (1997), ISBN 1-85619-525-2
- Austria: New Wines from the Old World (the Guide), Agrar Verlag (1997), ISBN 3-7040-1343-9
- Frederick the Great, Weidenfeld and Nicolson (1999), ISBN 0-297-81777-9
- The Last Kaiser: William the Impetuous, Weidenfeld and Nicolson (2000), ISBN 0-297-81776-0
- Portuguese Table Wines: the New Generation of Wines and Wine Makers, Grub Street (2001), ISBN 1-902304-86-1
- After the Reich: From the Liberation of Vienna to the Berlin Airlift, John Murray (2007), ISBN 978-0-7195-6770-4
- After the Reich: The Brutal History of the Allied Occupation, Basic Books, (2007), ISBN 978-0-465-00337-2
- 1938: Hitler's Gamble, Constable (2009), ISBN 978-1-84529-845-6
- The Great Battles: 50 Key Battles from the Ancient World to the Present Day, Quercus (2010), ISBN 978-1-84916-490-0
- On Germany, Hurst and Co. (2018), ISBN 978-1-849049450

=== Translations ===
- Henrik Eberle and Matthias Uhl, The Hitler Book John Murray 2005 ISBN 0-7195-5498-5
- Melissa Müller and Reinhard Piechocki, A Garden of Eden in Hell Macmillan 2007 ISBN 978-0-230-52802-4
- Karl Mayer et al., Wein/Wine Genesis Kulinarium Verlag 2009 ISBN 978-3-200-01538-8
- Blandine Vié, Testicles Prospect Books 2011 ISBN 978-1-903018-83-5
