= Henrik Eberle =

German historian

- Born: May 3, 1970 (age 56); Karl-Marx-Stadt, East Germany
- Education: Martin Luther University of Halle-Wittenberg
- Occupation: Historian
- Known for: The Hitler Book

Henrik Eberle (born 3 May 1970) is a German historian. During the first decade of the twenty-first century he came to prominence beyond the confines of the German academic community with compilations, books, articles and interviews concerned with Adolf Hitler. Some of these have been translated into English.

== Life ==
Henrik Eberle was born in Karl-Marx-Stadt (as Chemnitz was known between 1953 and 1990). His father was an engineer and his mother was a pharmacist.

Eberle studied history at Martin Luther University of Halle-Wittenberg, receiving his doctorate for a substantial work on the Martin Luther University under Nazism ("Die Martin-Luther-Universität in der Zeit des Nationalsozialismus") which was published as a book in 2002. By this time he had embarked on a career as a freelance writer and contributing editor. Media channels to which he contributed included Die Zeit and ZDF. A biographical work on Erich Honecker appeared in 2000 and broke new ground, providing thoughtful and well-informed insights. It was considered controversial in some quarters. Eberle himself insisted that it could not be classified as a satisfactory biography because it had not been possible to access Soviet archives from the 1950s and 1960s, a period crucial in Honecker's rise to power, and one during which within the party politburo Central Committee he had apparently been promoting plans for the invasion of West Germany.

Produced jointly by Eberle and his colleague Matthias Uhl, The Hitler Book has now been translated into more than 30 languages. It consists of a lengthy secret report prepared by senior NKVD officers and presented in 1949 to Joseph Stalin. The report had been inaccessible to western researchers for many years, and after 1991 apparently overlooked for another decade. The Soviet compilers had been able to access large amounts of documentary material obtained when the Soviets had captured Berlin (including the Reich Chancellery and the bunker in which Hitler had killed himself), and from the extensive interrogations of the Nazi leader's valet Heinz Linge and personal adjutant Otto Günsche.

Two years later, Eberle followed up The Hitler Book with "Briefe an Hitler", a 434-page compilation of hitherto unpublished letters received by Hitler, which makes extensive use of material found during searches of the Russian Defence Ministry archives along with other sources including the files of the estranged younger brother of Martin Bormann, Albert Bormann, who had handled much of their leader's routine correspondence.

For 2009 Henrik Eberle joined up with the physician and writer Hans-Joachim Neumann and together they produced a book entitled War Hitler krank? ("Was Hitler ill?"). The two of them revisited various sources, paying particular attention to papers from Hitler's private physician, Theo Morell, and produced a contribution on the psychopathography of Adolf Hitler. The book lists 82 different medications that Hitler used while he was in charge of Germany, and debunks various popular myths along the way, while also concluding that towards the end of his life he began to suffer from Parkinson's disease. The authors concluded that Hitler suffered from various conventional ailments, but was not mentally ill.
