= Health of Adolf Hitler =

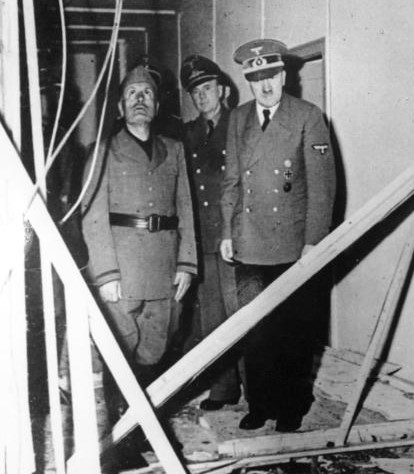
Adolf Hitler (right) showing Benito Mussolini the wreckage of the room Hitler was in when an assassination attempt by bombing occurred at his Wolf's Lair headquarters

The health of Adolf Hitler, the dictator of Germany from 1933 to 1945, has long been a subject of popular controversy, including both his physical and mental states.

Hitler had genetic markers for Kallmann syndrome, as revealed by 2025 DNA analysis. He is noted as having had a very strong sweet tooth. His other suspected health issues were exacerbated by the many drugs he was given by his unconventional doctor, Theodor Morell, as well as the 20 July 1944 attempt on his life. Partly because he had hand tremors late in life, it has been speculated that he had syphilis or Parkinson's disease.

== Trauma ==
=== First World War ===
During World War I, Hitler served as a dispatch runner for the List Regiment of the Bavarian Army. On the night of 13–14 October 1918, he and his comrades were victims of an Allied mustard gas attack near Ypres, Belgium. They had been leaving their dugout to retreat when the attack occurred, and were partially blinded by it. Hitler received initial treatment in Flanders, and on 21 October was sent to the military hospital in Pasewalk near Stettin in Pomerania. It was there that Hitler learned that Germany had asked the Allies for an armistice. He also learned that revolution was in the air. Hitler later claimed that it was while recuperating at Pasewalk that he became a virulent antisemite, although historians consider this to be unlikely, especially when Hitler referred to his conversion in terms of a vision he received. He left the hospital on 19 November, eight days after the armistice was signed.

=== 1944 assassination attempt ===
As a result of the 20 July 1944 assassination attempt – in which Hitler survived a bomb explosion at his Wolf's Lair headquarters – both of his eardrums were punctured, and he had numerous superficial wounds, including blisters, burns, and 200 wood splinters on his hands and legs, cuts on his forehead, abrasions and swelling on his left arm, and a right arm that was swollen, painful, and difficult to raise, requiring him to use his left hand to greet Benito Mussolini, who arrived that day for a previously scheduled summit meeting. The punctured eardrums were the most serious of these injuries. Weeks later, blood was still seeping through Hitler's bandages, and he suffered sharp pain in the right ear, as well as hearing loss. The eardrums took several weeks to heal, during which Hitler suffered from dizziness and a loss of balance which made him awkwardly hew to the right when walking. In addition, his blood pressure was high. One unusual result was that the trembling in Hitler's hands and left leg, which had increasingly afflicted him for sometime, abated for a time after the explosion, which Theodor Morell attributed to nervous shock; it returned in mid-September.

== Syphilis ==
Hitler's tremor and irregular heartbeat during the last years of his life could have been symptoms of tertiary (late stage) syphilis, which would mean he had a syphilis infection for many years. However, syphilis had become curable in 1910 with Dr. Paul Ehrlich's introduction of the drug Salvarsan.

In The Man with the Miraculous Hands, his biography of Dr. Felix Kersten, journalist Joseph Kessel wrote that in the winter of 1942, Kersten heard of Hitler's medical condition. Consulted by his patient, Heinrich Himmler, as to whether he could "assist a man who suffers from severe headaches, dizziness and insomnia", Kersten was shown a top-secret 26-page report. It detailed how Hitler had contracted syphilis in his youth and was treated for it at a hospital in Pasewalk. However, in 1937, symptoms re-appeared, showing that the disease was still active, and by the start of 1942, signs were evident that progressive syphilitic paralysis (tabes dorsalis) was occurring. Himmler advised Kersten that Morell (who in the 1930s claimed to be a venereologist) was in charge of Hitler's treatment and that it was a state secret. The book also relates how Kersten learned from Himmler's secretary, Rudolf Brandt, that at that time, probably the only other people privy to the report's information were Nazi Party chairman Martin Bormann and Hermann Göring, the head of the Luftwaffe.

== Monorchism ==
It has been alleged that Hitler had monorchism, the medical condition of having only one testicle. In 2008, a British newspaper reported that in 1916, a German doctor named Johan Jambor had encountered an injured Hitler during the Battle of the Somme. Jambor allegedly asserted that Hitler – who is known to have suffered a groin injury in the battle – had in fact lost a testicle. Jambor had supposedly described the dictator's condition to a priest, who later wrote down what he had been told.

Hitler was routinely examined by many doctors throughout his childhood, military service, and later political career, and no clinical mention of any such condition has ever been discovered. Eduard Bloch, Hitler's childhood doctor, told U.S. interrogators in 1943 that Hitler's genitals were in fact "completely normal".

== Huntington's disease ==
It has been speculated that Hitler had Huntington's disease. When many of the physical symptoms shown in newsreels during his later life – his hand tremor and shuffling gait – are coupled with his alleged mental and psychological deterioration, they may also point toward Huntington's. This is only conjecture, since a definitive diagnosis would require DNA testing. Although Huntington's disease was known and considered a hereditary disease during the time period, even appearing in state papers on the sterilisation list, it is not known if Hitler knew of this condition.

== Parkinson's disease ==
It has been opined that Hitler had Parkinson's disease. He was variously reported as having a tremor in one or both hands as early as the mid-1930s, joined by later symptoms by 1945 such as a stoop, masked face, and dragging one leg. Morell treated Hitler with a drug agent that was commonly used in 1945.

Werner Haase, Hitler's personal physician, who was in attendance every day from 21 April until Hitler's suicide on 30 April, was convinced that Hitler had Parkinson's disease. In addition, physician Ernst-Günther Schenck, who worked at an emergency casualty station in the Reich Chancellery during April 1945, also believed that Hitler might have Parkinson's disease. Schenck published his opinions and findings in a book, Patient Hitler. Eine medizinische Biographie, in 1989.

== Other complaints ==
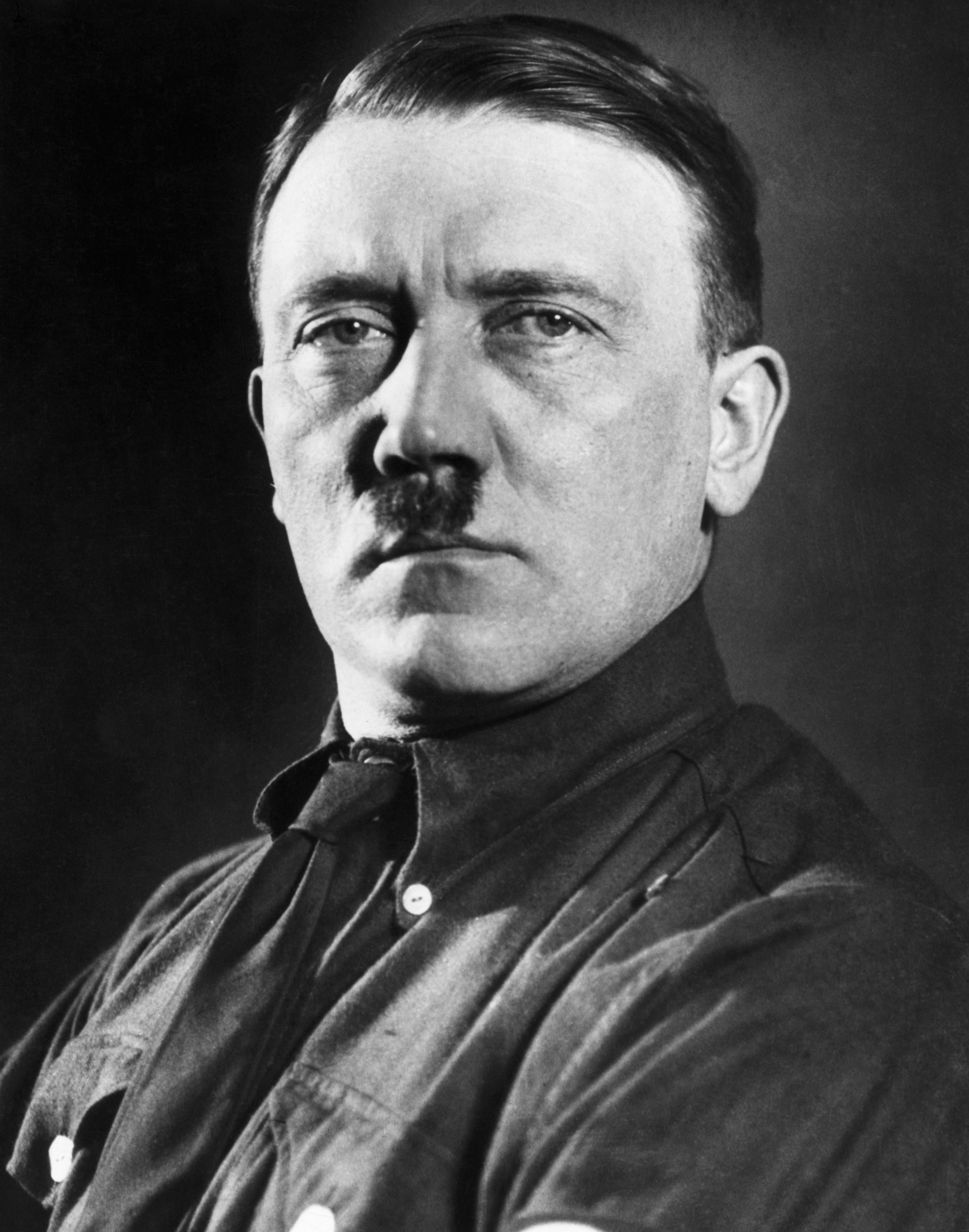
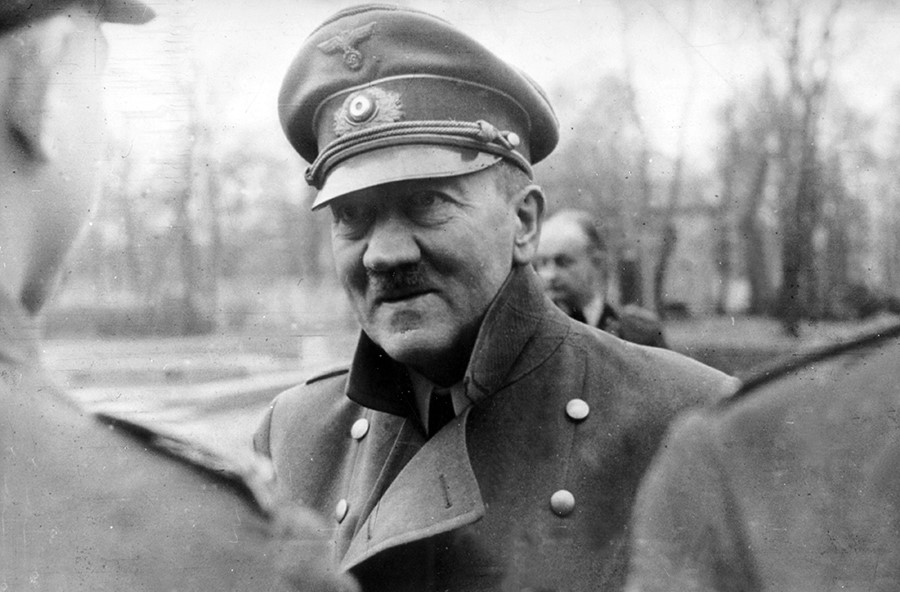
Hitler's enlarged nose

According to a medical examination from 1924, Hitler was 175 centimetres (5 ft 9 in) tall and weighed 77 kg (170 lb), making him slightly overweight. Another examination from 1937 reported his height to be 175.26 cm and his weight to be 67.04 kg (147.8 lb), which puts him in the normal weight category of the body mass index (BMI).

By his own account, since childhood, Hitler suffered gastrointestinal disorders brought on by stress, including abdominal colic, diarrhoea, constipation, and flatulence. Some degree of these continued throughout his life. By the 1930s, prolonged stress could make his stomach pains severe. In 1935, a non-cancerous polyp was removed from his throat. Hitler also developed eczema on his legs in 1936, but Morell successfully treated him by the end of 1937. The dictator sometimes wore glasses to study documents, but forbade the publication of photographs of him wearing them.

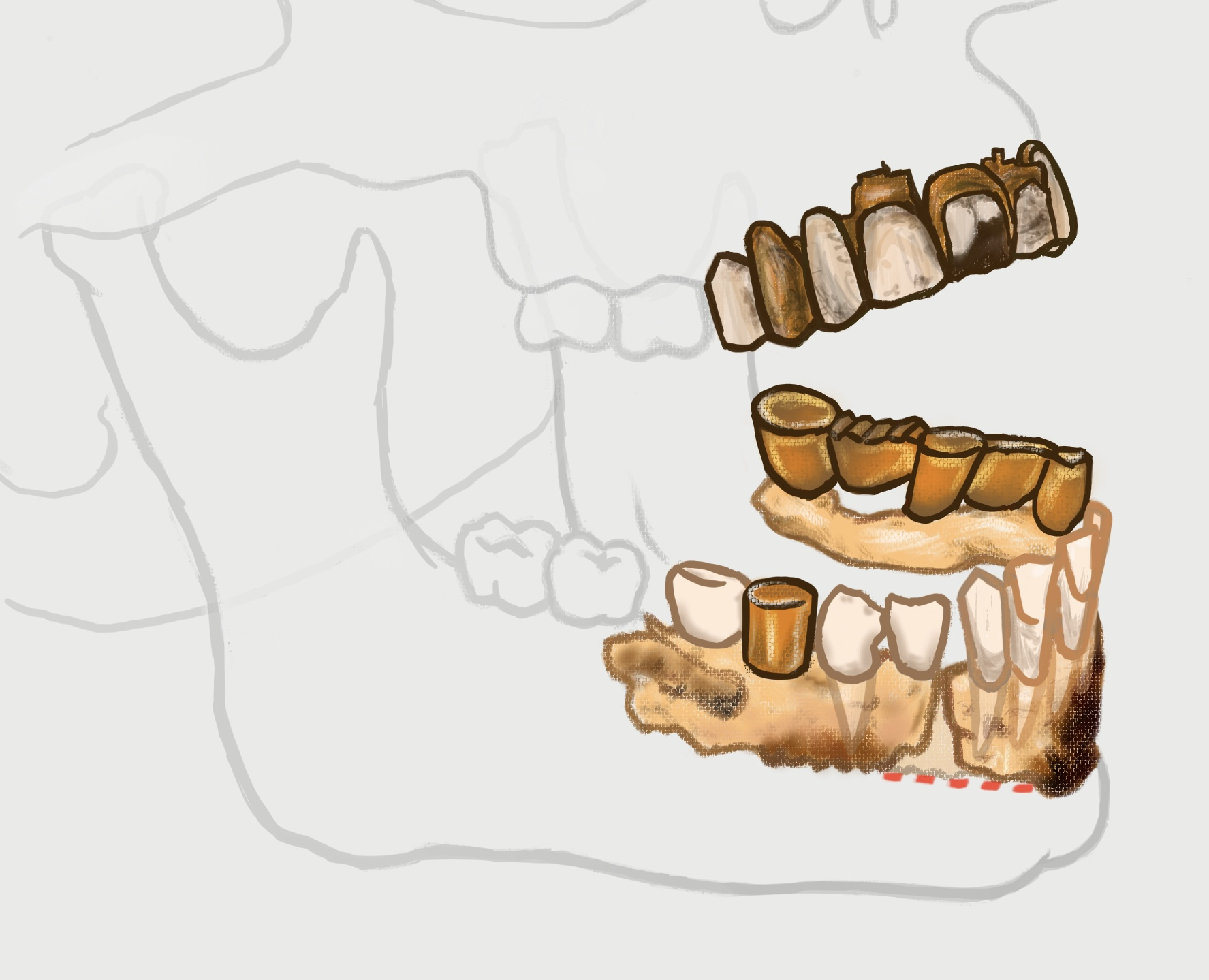
Hitler's dental remains

American journalist Frederick Cable Oechsner claimed c. 1943 that Hitler had a rhinoplasty in Munich sometime after 1933 to correct the shape of his nose, as it was purportedly "a little bulbous at the end and fatty on the bridge"; a 2007 medical analysis was unable to find evidence of this. Hitler's secretary Christa Schroeder similarly claimed that he first donned his toothbrush moustache (c. 1920s) to distract from a supposedly large nose, but this was only visibly engorged closer to the end of World War II.

Hitler had a mostly vegetarian diet and a very strong sweet tooth, often eating multiple cream cakes at a sitting. By the end of the war, most of his teeth had been augmented or replaced by gold teeth, resulting in unmistakable dental remains, which are cited as the main evidence of his death in 1945. Nevertheless, Hitler is often asserted by fringe theories to have faked his death, implying a marginal mandibulectomy (with certain eyewitnesses providing different stories about why the dental remains might be found detached). According to one report to the FBI, Hitler allegedly made it to Argentina and was suffering from asthma and ulcers. (Note: History's fringe series Hunting Hitler implies Chile and the FBI's investigation of Nazi spy networks in South America to possibly corroborate the dictator's escape.)

In 2025, blood from the sofa where Hitler committed suicide was used by Turi King of the University of Bath for DNA analysis. The blood was confirmed to be Hitler's by comparing it to DNA from a relative with shared paternal ancestry. Analysis of the genetic material revealed that he had markers for Kallmann syndrome, a genetic disorder that prevents a person from starting or fully completing puberty. Many males with the syndrome have an undescended testicle and 10 percent have a micropenis; most have low testosterone levels. An additional symptom of Kallmann syndrome is a reduced or total lack of sense of smell. King cites Hitler's facial hair and relatively deep tone in the only known recording of him speaking unofficially as showing that he did enter puberty.

== Mental health ==
Although Adolf Hitler was never formally diagnosed with any mental illnesses during his lifetime, he has often been associated with psychiatric conditions such as bipolar disorder, schizophrenia, psychopathy, and amphetamine psychosis, both during his lifetime and after his death. The disturbances have been incorporated into psychobiographies of Hitler. Psychiatrists and psychoanalysts who have diagnosed the dictator as having such mental states include well-known figures such as Walter C. Langer and Erich Fromm. Other researchers like Frederick Redlich have not been persuaded that Hitler evidenced such disorders.

== Drug use ==
As early as 1937, Hitler abstained from drinking and smoking.

Prescribed 90 medications during the war years by Morell, Hitler took up to 28 pills a day for his various ailments. He regularly consumed methamphetamine, barbiturates, opiates, cocaine, testosterone (regularly from 1944 on), potassium bromide, and deadly nightshade (in the form of Doktor Koster's Antigaspills).

According to Käthe Heusermann (assistant to Hitler's dentist, Hugo Blaschke) Hitler would accept "only the bare minimum" of anesthetic, sitting motionlessly through a dental extraction in November 1944.

== Criticism of using Hitler's health to explain Nazism ==
In a 1980 article, German historian Hans-Ulrich Wehler was highly dismissive of all theories that sought to attribute the rise and policies of Nazi Germany to some defect, medical or otherwise, of Hitler's. In Wehler's opinion, besides being extremely difficult to prove, these theories essentially attributed the whole phenomenon of Nazi Germany to one flawed individual. Wehler wrote:

Does our understanding of National Socialist policies really depend on whether Hitler had only one testicle?...Perhaps the Führer had three, which made things difficult for him, who knows?...Even if Hitler could be regarded irrefutably as a sado-masochist, which scientific interest does that further?...Does the 'Final Solution of the Jewish Question' thus become more easily understandable or the 'twisted road to Auschwitz' become the one-way street of a psychopath in power?

Echoing Wehler's views, British historian Ian Kershaw argued that it was better to take a broader view of German history by seeking to examine what social forces led to the Third Reich and its policies, as opposed to the "personalised" explanations for the Holocaust and World War II.

In his book Explaining Hitler: The Search for the Origins of His Evil (1998), American journalist Ron Rosenbaum sarcastically remarked that theories concerning Hitler's mental state and sexual activity shed more light on the theorists and their culture than on Hitler.

== Inbreeding as a possible factor ==
It has been theorised that Hitler's physical and mental health problems were the result of his having been significantly inbred, with his father, Alois Hitler, possibly being his mother's second cousin. Inbred people have a higher chance of having developmental disorders and harmful mutations, ostensibly explaining reports of Hitler's monorchism, but there is no conclusive evidence of this applying to Hitler.

== Bibliography ==
- Bezymenski, L. (1968). The Death of Adolf Hitler: Unknown Documents from Soviet Archives. Harcourt Brace. ISBN 0-7181-0634-2.
- Blackburn, Jack (12 November 2025). "Hitler had hidden genetic sexual disorder, DNA analysis reveals". The Times.
- Boehm U, Bouloux PM, Dattani MT, de Roux N, Dodé C, Dunkel L, Dwyer AA, Giacobini P, Hardelin JP, Juul A, Maghnie M, Pitteloud N, Prevot V, Raivio T, Tena-Sempere M, Quinton R, Young J (September 2015). "Expert consensus document: European Consensus Statement on congenital hypogonadotropic hypogonadism--pathogenesis, diagnosis and treatment". Nature Reviews. Endocrinology. 11 (9): 547–64. doi:10.1038/nrendo.2015.112. hdl:11567/821921. PMID 26194704.
- Doyle, D. (2005). Hitler's Medical Care (PDF). Archived from the original (PDF) on 27 September 2007.
- Heston, L. (1980). The Medical Casebook of Adolf Hitler: His Illnesses, Doctors, and Drugs. Stein & Day. ISBN 0-8128-2718-X.
- Heston, L. (2000). The Medical Casebook of Adolf Hitler. Cooper Square Press. ISBN 0-8154-1066-2.
- Heston, L. (1999). Adolf Hitler: A Medical Descent That Changed History His Drug Abuse, Doctors, Illnesses. Baypoint Press. ISBN 0-9665852-9-1.
- Kershaw, Ian (1998). Hitler 1889-1936: Hubris. New York: Norton. ISBN 0-393-04671-0.
- Kershaw, Ian (2000). Hitler 1936–45: Nemesis. New York: Norton. ISBN 0-393-04994-9.
- Langer, Walter C. (1972). The Mind of Adolf Hitler: The Secret Wartime Report. New York: Basic Books. ISBN 0-465-04620-7.
- Oltermann, Philip (13 November 2025). "Did Hitler really have a 'micropenis'? The dubious documentary analysing the dictator's DNA". The Guardian.
- Porter, Tom (24 August 2013). "Adolf Hitler 'Took Cocktail of Drugs' Reveal New Documents". IB Times.
- Rosenbaum, Ron (1999). Explaining Hitler: The Search for the Origins of His Evil. Harper Perennial. ISBN 0-06-095339-X.
- Schwaab, E. (1992). Hitler's Mind: A Plunge into Madness. Praeger Publishers. ISBN 0-275-94132-9.
- Ullrich, Volker (2016). Hitler. Ascent, 1889–1939. London: The Bodley Head. ISBN 978-1-84792-286-1.
- Victor, G. (1999). Hitler: The Pathology of Evil. Potomac Books. ISBN 1-57488-228-7.
- Zalampas, S. (1990). Adolf Hitler: A Psychological Interpretation of His Views on Architecture Art and Music. Bowling Green State University Popular Press. ISBN 0-87972-488-9.

Further reading

- Lewis, D. (2004). The Man Who Invented Hitler: The Making of the Fuhrer. Headline Book Publishing. ISBN 0-7553-1149-3.
- Machtan, Lothar (2002). trans. J. Brownjohn (ed.). The Hidden Hitler. Basic Books. ISBN 0-465-04308-9.
- Murray, Henry A. (1943). Analysis of the Personality of Adolph Hitler: With Predictions of His Future Behavior and Suggestions for Dealing with Him Now and After Germany's Surrender. Archived from the original on 30 January 2005.
- Waite, Robert G. L. (1993) [1977]. The Psychopathic God: Adolf Hitler. New York: DaCapo Press. ISBN 0-306-80514-6.
