= The Psychopathic God =

1977 psychbiography of Adolf Hitler by Canadian historian Robert G. L. Waite

The Psychopathic God: Adolf Hitler
- Cover of the first edition
- Author: Robert G. L. Waite
- Language: English
- Subject: Adolf Hitler
- Publisher: Basic Books
- Publication date: 1977
- Media type: Print
- ISBN: 0-465-06743-3
- LC Class: DD247.H5

The Psychopathic God: Adolf Hitler is a book by the Canadian historian Robert G. L. Waite, in which Waite examines Hitler's life and psychopathology with the aid of psychological professionals.

Originally published by Basic Books in 1977, a mass market paperback edition was published in 1978 by New American Library. The book was republished in 1993 by Da Capo Press.

== Origin of the title ==
The title is taken from a passage in W. H. Auden's poem, "September 1, 1939":

Accurate scholarship can
Unearth the whole offence
From Luther until now
That has driven a culture mad,
Find what occurred at Linz,
What huge imago made
A psychopathic God:
I and the public know
What all schoolchildren learn,
Those to whom evil is done
Do evil in return.

The title of Auden's poem refers to the date that Hitler's tanks rolled into Poland. This date is generally acknowledged as the beginning of World War II.

== See also ==
- Psychobiography
- Psychohistory
- List of Adolf Hitler books
