= Robert G. L. Waite =

Canadian historian, psychohistorian, and Brown Professor of History

Robert George Leeson Waite
- Born: February 18, 1919; Cartwright, Manitoba, Canada
- Died: October 4, 1999 (aged 80); Glastonbury, Connecticut, U.S.

Academic background
- Education: Macalester College; University of Minnesota College of Liberal Arts; Harvard University

Academic work
- Discipline: History

Robert George Leeson Waite (February 18, 1919 – October 4, 1999) was an American Canadian historian, psychohistorian, and the Brown Professor of History (1949–1988) at Williams College who specialized in the Nazi movement, particularly Adolf Hitler.

== Early life and undergraduate education ==
Waite was born in Cartwright, Manitoba, on February 18, 1919. His father was a minister of the United Church of Canada. He grew up as a "preacher's kid," in the prairie towns of Manitoba and Minnesota. When describing his life, he captured the flavor of these small towns, adopting the cadence, regional expressions, and accents of the Scandinavian farmers and the families with whom he grew up.

In the fall of 1937, Waite entered Macalester College in St. Paul, Minnesota, in the midst of the Great Depression. To supplement his scholarship and to earn whatever spending money he could, Waite held a variety of jobs, from working in the open pit mines of the Mesabi Range in northern Minnesota to guarding the supposed corpse of John Wilkes Booth in a traveling carnival.

== Military service ==
Upon graduating from Macalester in 1941, he entered military service from which he was discharged three years later as a corporal—a distinction he insisted be included in his curriculum vitae.

== Graduate education and academic interests ==
Following World War II, Waite completed graduate studies in history at the University of Minnesota, where he received his master's degree. He then entered Harvard University and began researching German history with particular emphasis on the Nazi period. His dissertation on the Freikorps movement in post-World War I Germany, written under the supervision of H. Stuart Hughes, was published under the title, Vanguard of Nazism (1952). Upon receiving his PhD in 1949, Waite was appointed to the faculty at Williams College in Massachusetts where he began his psychohistorical work on Adolf Hitler.

== Depression and academic impact ==
Waite's interest in psychohistory was influenced in part by his own experience during his first year of teaching at Williams College, where he suffered from depression—what he called "black despair." The young professor convinced himself he was a total failure and even submitted his resignation. Then the college president, James Phinney Baxter, refused to accept his resignation and personally arranged an appointment with a well-known psychiatrist. Waite took medical leave with the assurance that his job would be waiting for him.

His struggle with depression influenced his studies greatly, particularly when he began researching the psychohistorical profile of Adolf Hitler. He frequently told colleagues: "the career of Adolf Hitler raises questions that can be answered neither by psychology nor by history working alone."

== Waite's primary source solution ==
Waite's psychohistorical solution for balancing judgment and understanding was to rely extensively on quotations from those he studied. In Vanguard of Nazism, he quoted the Freikorps fighters at length "to convey their spirit as accurately as possible by letting them speak for themselves." Relying on their own words not only gave his readers access to the Freikorpsmen's psychological and political universe, it also allowed Waite to scrutinize them more accurately and in context. He quoted the members of the Freikorps so extensively, Waite told the readers of the Vanguard of Nazism, "had I relied on paraphrase, it seems probable that I would not have been believed."

== Retirement ==
Waite published his comparative study of Hitler and Wilhelm II and completed a light-hearted memoir entitled, Hitler, the Kaiser, and Me: An Academic's Procession, which appeared only weeks before his death and now serves as his valedictory.

== Death ==
Robert G. L. Waite suffered a massive stroke and died on October 4, 1999, at the age of 80.

== Publications ==
- Vanguard of Nazism, 1918-1923, (Harvard U.P; Oxford U.P, 1952)
- Hitler and Nazi Germany, (Holt, Rinehart and Winston, 1965)
- Vanguard of Nazism: the Free Corps Movement in Post-war Germany, 1918-1923, (Harvard University Press, 1969)
- Juvenile Delinquency in Nazi Germany, 1933-1945, (State University of New York at Binghamton, 1980)
- The Psychopathic God: Adolf Hitler, (Da Capo Press, 1993)
- Kaiser and Führer: A Comparative Study of Personality and Politics (University of Toronto Press 1998)
- Hitler, The Kaiser, and Me: An Academic's Procession, (R.G.L. Waite, 1999)
