= Frederick Redlich =

American psychiatrist (1910–2004)

- Born: Frederick Carl Redlich

Frederick Carl Redlich ("Fritz") (June 2, 1910 – January 1, 2004) was a psychiatrist and academic administrator. He was dean of the Yale School of Medicine from 1967 to 1972.

== Personal life ==
Redlich was born in Vienna, the son of Ludwig Johann and Emma Redlich, and received his M.D. in 1935 from the University of Vienna. Following graduation, Redlich was an intern at Vienna General Hospital (1935–1936) and a psychiatric resident at Vienna University Clinic (1936–1938). He moved to the United States in 1938 with his wife Elsa (divorced 1953). They had two sons, Erik Christopher (1941–2002), and Peter J. 195?. They became U.S. citizen in 1943. Later Fritz married operatic mezzo-soprano Herta Glaz with whom he was together for nearly 50 years.

== Career ==
He joined the faculty of Yale in 1942. In addition to his time as dean of the School of Medicine, Redlich was head of the department of psychiatry from 1950 to 1967.

He was a member of the Institute of Medicine and the American Academy of Arts and Sciences. He was honored with Distinguished Service Awards from the American College of Psychiatrists and the American Psychiatric Association.

== Works ==
In 1952 Redlich co-edited with Eugene Brody the widely read book, "Psychotherapy With Schizophrenics."

Redlich is best known within the field of Community Mental Health for his groundbreaking study done in the late 1950s with sociologist August Hollingshead. In the study, "Social Class and Mental Illness" the two researched the mentally ill population of New Haven, Connecticut and the treatment they received within a calendar year.

Two aspects of the study have contributed to its historical significance. First, was the large, almost complete sample of all people from New Haven who sought psychiatric treatment in that year. This was achieved by identifying and communicating with psychiatric practitioners throughout the eastern United States as well as within New Haven.

The second aspect of the study was its definition of social class by income level with the designation of five social classes using the Roman numerals I though V (V being the poorest). This system of class designation is still utilized in current social science research. The outcome of the study demonstrated that the majority of people in the upper two social classes received insight or talking therapy which was non-bodily intrusive and took place in private settings. The majority of the lowest social class received their treatment in public institutions. Their treatment consisted primarily of constraint and intrusive methods ( such as cold packs, electroshock, and lobotomies). The conclusions of their study were that social class plays a significant role in psychiatric diagnosis and treatment, with the upper social classes receiving less intrusive therapy.

== Bibliography ==
- Redlich, F.K. (1937) Beitrag zur Kasuistik der Hypophysentumoren. Wiener Archiv für innere Medizin 30, 111–126.
- Redlich, F.K. (1937) Der Bewußtseinsverlust beim cerebralen Insult. Deutsche Zeitschrift für Nervenheilkunde 143, 251–267. DOI: https://doi.org/10.1007/BF01761387
- Nowotny, K., & Redlich, F.K. (1938) Zur Klinik und Pathologie der Myasthenia Gravis. Klinische Wochenschrift 17, 262–267. DOI: https://doi.org/10.1007/BF01779874
- Freudenberg, R., & Redlich, F.K. (1938) Prostigminwirkung und Cholinesterase bei der Myasthenia gravis. Archiv für experimentelle Pathologie und Pharmakologie 188, 645–649. DOI: https://doi.org/10.1007/BF01859206
- Redlich, F.K. (1938) Das Weltmannsche Koagulationsband in der psychiatrisch-neurologischen Diagnostik. Zeitschrift für die gesamte Neurologie und Psychiatrie 162, 802–814. DOI: https://doi.org/10.1007/BF02890997
- Redlich, F.C. (1939) Metrazol Shock Treatment. Pharmacological And Biochemical Studies. American Journal of Psychiatry 96(1), 193–204. DOI: https://doi.org/10.1176/ajp.96.1.193
- Brody, E.B., & Redlich, F.C. (eds.) (1952) Psychotherapy with Schizophrenics. New York: International Universities Press.
- Redlich, F.C., & Bingham, J. (1953) The Inside Story. Psychiatry and Everyday Life. New York: Alfred A. Knopf.
- Redlich, F.C. (1954) The Influence of Environment on Mental Health. Bulletin of the New York Academy of Medicine 30(8), 608–621.
- Gill, M., Newman, R., Redlich, F.C., & Sommers, M. (1954) The Initial Interview in Psychiatric Practice. New York: International Universities Press.
- Redlich, F.C. (1957) The Concept of Health in Psychiatry. In A.C. Leighton, J.A Clausen & R.N. Wilson, (eds.) Explorations in Social Psychiatry. New York: Basic Books, 138–164.
- Hollingshead, A.B., & Redlich, F.C. (1958) Social Class and Mental Illness: A Community Study. New York: Wiley.
- Redlich, F.C., & Freedman, D.X. (1966) The Theory and Practice of Psychiatry. New York: Basic Books.
- Redlich, F.C. (1993) A New Medical Diagnosis of Adolf Hitler. Giant Cell Arteritis-Temporal Arteritis. Archives of Internal Medicine 153(6), 693–697.
- Redlich, F. (1998) Hitler: Diagnosis of a Destructive Prophet. Oxford, England: Oxford University Press.
