= Analysis of the Personality of Adolph Hitler =

World War II American attempt to psychoanalyse Hitler

Analysis of the Personality of Adolph Hitler: With Predictions of His Future Behavior and Suggestions for Dealing with Him Now and After Germany's Surrender is a report that was prepared by Henry A. Murray for the United States Office of Strategic Services during World War II. It was one of two psychoanalytic reports prepared for the OSS on Nazi Germany leader Adolf (sometimes spelled "Adolph") Hitler; the other was "A Psychological Analysis of Adolph Hitler: His Life and Legend" (later published in book form under the title The Mind of Adolf Hitler).

Murray's report is dated October 1943. A copy in PDF is available from the Cornell Law School library, which received copyright permission to publish the report online from Murray's family in 2004. The Cornell copy is serialized as copy number 3 of 30. The report forms a part of the law library's Donovan Collection, which contains the papers of the OSS chief William J. Donovan.

== History ==
Murray prepared the report, which consists of the following:

- 6 unnumbered pages of Introductory Material (consisting of a cover page, a foreword and a table of contents)
- Section 1 (pages numbered 1-53) entitled a Condensed Review of the Entire Memorandum, which contains
  - Part A (pages 1–29), Brief Analysis of Hitler's Personality
  - Part B (pages 29 – 33), Predictions of Hitler's Behavior
  - Part C (pages 33 – 38), Suggestions for the Treatment of Hitler
  - Part D (pages 38 – 53), Suggestions for the Treatment of the German People
- Section 2, a work by W.H.D. Vernon (numbered as pages 54 – 81) entitled Hitler the Man - Notes for a Case Study
- Section 3 (numbered as pages 82 – 227) appearing here, which is intended for "psychologists and psychiatrists."

The sources for the report, identified in the introductory material, are all published sources, including the paper which was prepared by Vernon (Section 2) under Murray's general supervision. Unlike the report prepared by Langer (see The Mind of Adolf Hitler), Murray conducted no personal interviews of Hitler associates.

There is some overlap between the two wartime reports. Murray's biographer asserts that Langer copied from Murray without crediting his work.

== Reference Works ==
- Langer, Walter Charles (1972). The Mind of Adolf Hitler: The Secret Wartime Report. Basic Books. ISBN 0-465-04620-7.
