= Walter Charles Langer =

American psychoanalyst (1899–1981)

Walter Charles Langer (February 5, 1899 – July 4, 1981) was an American psychoanalyst.

He studied psychoanalysis at Harvard University, where he worked as a professor upon completion of his education. He was later employed by the Office of Strategic Services (OSS), where in 1943 he prepared a psychoanalytic profile of Hitler. In this analysis, Langer accurately predicted that Hitler would commit suicide as the "most plausible outcome", and the possibility of a military coup against Hitler well before the assassination attempt of 1944.

Following Langer's analysis and Hitler's subsequent death, Langer turned the report into a book about Adolf Hitler, The Mind of Adolf Hitler: A Secret Wartime Report. This book was Langer's best-known; however, he also wrote the books Psychology and Human Living, A Psychological analysis of Adolf Hitler: His Life and Legend, and Dissecting the Hitler Mind.

== Early life and education ==
Langer was born on February 5, 1899, in South Boston to Charles Rudolph and Johanna Rockenbach, recent immigrants from Germany. His mother was born to a Lutheran household in Zweibrücken, Germany, and his father was a member of the Moravian Brethren from Silesia, Germany. Langer had an older brother named William and another brother named Rudolph Langer. The family later moved when Charles became an owner of a florist shop. After their father died in 1899, the family lost all their savings. To help support the family, Walter worked at a grocery store while going to school. Just after two years of high school, Walter had to drop out and get a full-time job as an apprentice electrician, where he mostly wired houses for two years. While the family moved to Cambridge, he was admitted to Rindge Technical High School to finish out his high school education. He was later accepted at Massachusetts Institute of Technology and during World War I, serviced in the military for 27 months. After being discharged in 1919, Walter chose to pursue the psychology field at Harvard University.

Langer attended Harvard University, graduating as part of the class of 1923. Langer continued to study at Harvard until attaining his PhD in psychology in 1935. The same year, he traveled to pursue studies in psychoanalysis in Vienna, Austria, where he studied under Anna Freud, daughter of Sigmund Freud. Langer also saw the elder Freud regularly during this time and accompanied him on his trip into exile in 1938. In addition to Freud, Langer helped many Jewish scientists and Anti-Nazi activists escape, obtaining visas for many Austrian analysts and transporting small groups of refugees to the Swiss border.

== Career ==
Langer worked as a psychoanalyst at Harvard University. Following his graduation, Langer was accepted into the American Psychiatric Association (APA). However, Langer was accepted into the APA against common practice as he was the first to be admitted without obtaining an M.D. It wasn't until after finishing high school late and being accepted into MIT that he discovered his interest in psychoanalysis and abandoned the route of an electrician. While attending college, World War I began and Langer enlisted, serving twenty seven months. While away at war he was able to view a wide array of body language and contextual actions of those around him. This experience had led to Langers increased interest in interpreting and analyzing others. It was Langers time serving his country that sparked his interest and guided him to pursue psychology and behaviorism at Harvard University after being discharged from the service in 1919.

After accumulating enough money from publishing a high school textbook titled Psychology and Human Living, Langer traveled to Germany and began working with Anna Freud. Langer's time in Germany had overlapped with the historical entrance of Adolf Hitler. As Hitler gained power in Germany, Langer had first-hand experience as to the devastation that was brought to the civilians of the country. Due to his educational background and direct experience, Langer had a personal interest in Adolf Hitler and went to work for the OSS, where he later predicted Hitler's means of death (namely, that Hitler would commit suicide when he lost the war).

Langer also continued to produce multiple books in relation to Adolf Hitler after his death, the most notable being The Mind of Adolf Hitler: The Secret Wartime Report.

== Retirement and death ==
Langer retired in Florida, and died in Sarasota, Florida in 1981, aged 82.

== Legacy ==
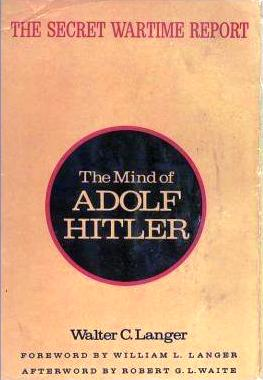
Cover of Langer's book, The Mind of Adolf Hitler, published in 1972

Langer's most popular work, The Mind of Adolf Hitler, helped put psychology on the map in American popular culture. Despite many controversies, the profile has been influential in the field of profiling political leaders. Langer himself offered a statement on the value of psychobiography for political means, stating: "I may be naïve in diplomatic matters, but I like to believe that if such a study of Hitler had been made years earlier, under less tension, and with more opportunity to gather first-hand information, there might not have been a Munich; a similar study of Stalin might have produced a different Yalta; one of Castro might have prevented the Cuban situation; and one of President Diem might have avoided our deep involvement in Vietnam. Studies of this type cannot solve our international problems. That would be too much to expect. They might, however, help to avoid some of the serious blunders we seemed to have made because we were ignorant of the psychological factors involved and the nature of the leaders with whom we were negotiating".

Following the Langer profile, U.S. presidents began requesting profiles of foreign diplomats before important events and meetings. John F. Kennedy requested a profile of Soviet Premier Nikita Khrushchev as part of preparing for the 1961 Vienna summit, and President Richard Nixon asked the Central Intelligence Agency (CIA) for profiles of both Mao Zedong and Zhou Enlai before embarking on his first visit to China.

From 1965 to 1986, the CIA operated a Center for the Analysis of Personality and Political Behavior, directed by Gerald M. Post, who cited Langer as an influence. Although the center was closed with the dissolution of the Cold War, personality research and psychobiography of political leaders continues to be of interest to both government agencies and the general public.

== In popular culture ==
- The Military Channel program Inside the Mind of Adolf Hitler is based on The Mind of Adolf Hitler, and dramatized scenes connected to Langer's investigation.

== Publications ==
- The Mind of Adolf Hitler: The Secret Wartime Report Basic Books (1972) ISBN 0-465-04620-7
- Psychology & Human Living (1945) ISBN 0-89197-517-9
