= Sexuality of Adolf Hitler =

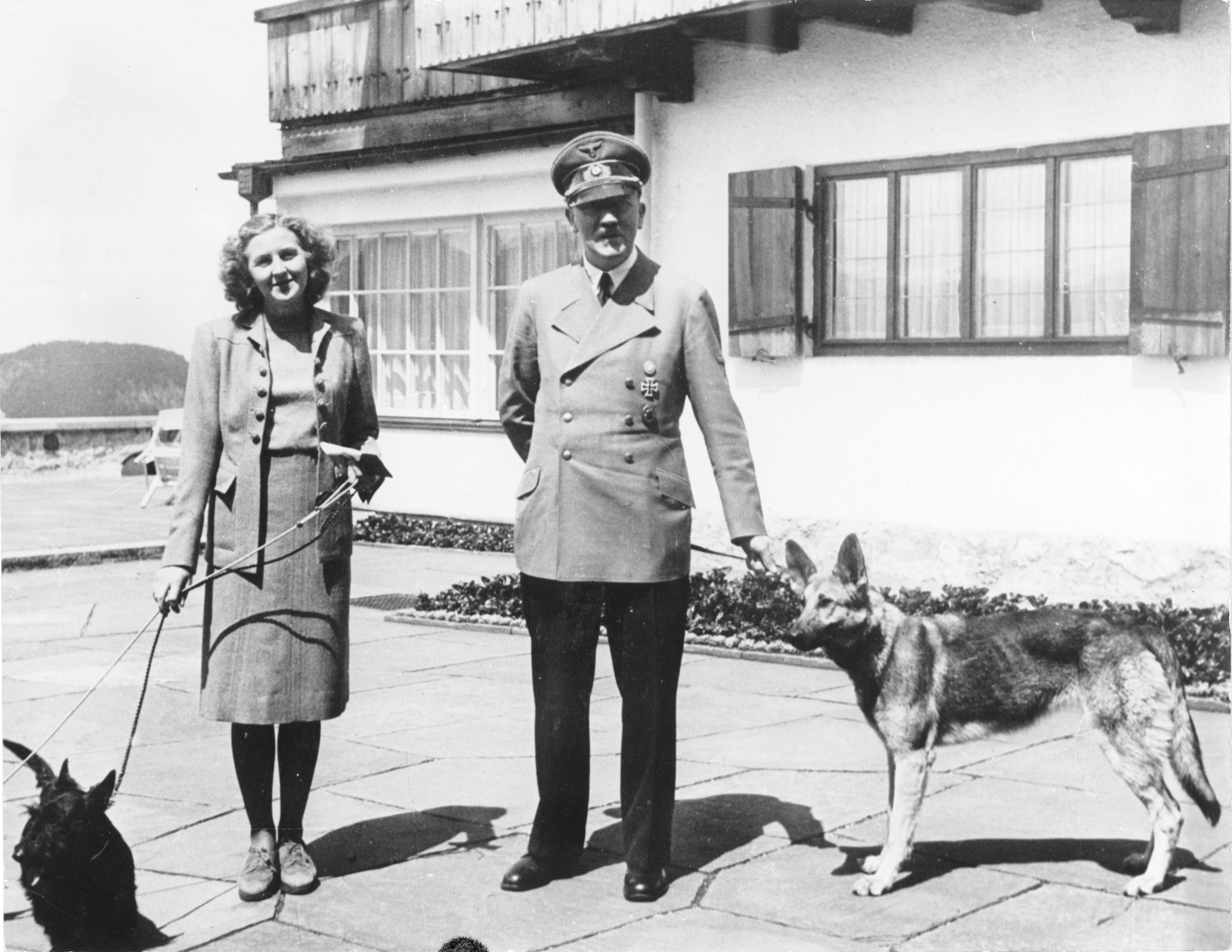
Adolf Hitler and Eva Braun with their dogs at the Berghof, 1942

The sexuality of Adolf Hitler, dictator of Nazi Germany from 1933 to 1945, has long been a matter of historical and scholarly debate, as well as speculation and rumour. There is evidence that he had relationships with a number of women during his lifetime, as well as evidence of his antipathy to homosexuality, and no evidence of homosexual encounters. His name has been linked to a number of possible female lovers, two of whom committed suicide. A third died of complications eight years after a suicide attempt, and a fourth also attempted suicide.

Hitler created a public image of a celibate man without a domestic life, dedicated entirely to his political mission and the governance of Nazi Germany. His relationship with Eva Braun, which lasted nearly 14 years, was hidden from the public and all but his inner circle. Braun biographer Heike Görtemaker notes that the couple enjoyed a normal sex life. Hitler and Braun married in late April 1945, less than 40 hours before committing suicide together.

Two wartime reports by the Allies attempted to analyse Hitler psychologically. A 1943 report by Walter C. Langer for the U.S. Office of Strategic Services (OSS) describes Hitler as having repressed homosexual tendencies and opined that he was an impotent coprophile. Psychologist Henry Murray wrote a separate psychoanalytical report for the OSS in 1943 that drew similar conclusions. Otto Strasser, one of Hitler's opponents in the Nazi Party, also told his post-war interrogators a similar story. British historian Ian Kershaw describes Strasser's statement as "anti-Hitler propaganda".

In research following Hitler's death, a variety of claims have been made about Hitler's sexual orientation: that he was homosexual, bisexual, or asexual. Conclusive evidence is lacking, but most historians believe he was heterosexual. There is at least one claim that Hitler had an illegitimate child (named Jean-Marie Loret) with one of his lovers. Mainstream historians, such as Kershaw, dismiss this as unlikely or impossible.

== Historical accounts ==
Hitler's sex life has long been the subject of speculation and rumours, many of which were invented or "spiced up" by his political enemies. While the sexual preferences of many members of Hitler's inner circle are known, conclusive evidence of Hitler's sexuality is lacking. The evidence that exists about Hitler's private life is largely from people in his inner circle, such as his adjutants, his secretaries, Albert Speer, the Wagner family, and others. There is evidence that he had infatuations with several women, as well as evidence of his antipathy to homosexuality, and no evidence that he engaged in homosexual behaviour. Kershaw describes him as being repelled by personal contact and sexual activity, including homosexuality and prostitution, especially as a young man in Vienna. He was afraid of contracting a sexually transmitted infection.

Kershaw notes that as a soldier during the First World War, Hitler did not take part in discussions of sex with his comrades. When teased about his celibacy during this period, Hitler responded by saying "I'd die of shame looking for sex with a French girl," and "Have you no German sense of honour left at all?" When asked by a comrade if he had ever loved a girl, Hitler replied "I've never had time for anything like that, and I'll never get round to it."

== Relationships with women ==
Hitler created a public image of a celibate man without a domestic life, dedicated entirely to his political mission. He considered himself to be attractive to women, partly because of his position of power. Speer recalled him stating a preference for unintelligent women who would not challenge him about his work or prevent him from relaxing in his leisure time. Kershaw speculates that Hitler preferred younger women who were easy to dominate and mould. He notes that at least three of Hitler's close female associates (Eva Braun, Geli Raubal, and Maria Reiter) were far younger than himself: Braun was 23 years younger, Raubal was 19 years younger, and Reiter was 21 years his junior.

Ernst Hanfstaengl, one of the members of Hitler's inner circle in the early years in Munich, wrote that "I felt Hitler was a case of a man who was neither fish, flesh nor fowl, neither fully homosexual nor fully heterosexual... I had formed the firm conviction that he was impotent, the repressed, masturbating type." Nevertheless, Hanfstaengl was convinced enough of Hitler's heterosexuality that he unsuccessfully tried to encourage a romantic relationship between Hitler and Martha Dodd, daughter of the American ambassador. According to Hanfstaengl, filmmaker Leni Riefenstahl tried to begin a relationship with Hitler early on, but he turned her down. Magda Goebbels invited Hitler to parties to encourage him to meet women, but he showed no interest. When pro-Nazi foreign women like Unity Mitford visited, Hitler usually lectured them about politics.

=== Geli Raubal ===
Hitler was deeply attached to his half-niece Geli Raubal, 19 years his junior. She began living at his residence after her mother, Angela, became Hitler's housekeeper in 1925. Although the exact nature and extent of their relationship is unknown, Kershaw describes it as a latent "sexual dependence." It was rumoured among contemporaries that they were in a romantic relationship. Geli committed suicide with Hitler's gun in his Munich apartment in September 1931. Her death was a source of deep, lasting pain for Hitler.

=== Eva Braun ===
Hitler's relationship with Eva Braun, which lasted nearly 14 years, was hidden from the public and all but his inner circle. Within that circle, he was open about Braun, and they lived together at Berchtesgaden as a couple. Hitler's valet, Heinz Linge, stated in his memoirs that Hitler and Braun had two bedrooms and two bathrooms with interconnecting doors at the Berghof, and Hitler would end most evenings alone with her in his study before they retired to bed. She would wear a "dressing gown or house-coat" and drink wine; Hitler would have tea. Braun biographer Heike Görtemaker notes that the couple enjoyed a normal sex life. Braun's friends and relatives described her giggling over a 1938 photograph of Neville Chamberlain sitting on a sofa in Hitler's Munich flat with the remark: "If only he knew what goings-on that sofa has seen."

Hitler's letters provide evidence that he was fond of her, and worried when she participated in sports or was late returning for tea. His secretary Traudl Junge stated that during the war, Hitler telephoned Braun every day. He was concerned for her safety when she was staying in the Munich home he had bought her. Junge further asked Hitler once why he never married. Hitler replied, "...I wouldn't have been able to give enough time to my wife". Hitler told her that he did not want children, as they would have had "...a very hard time, because they're expected to possess the same gifts as their famous parents and they can't be forgiven for being mediocre." In the end, Hitler and Braun married in the Berlin Führerbunker in late-April 1945, less than 40 hours before committing suicide together.

== Views on homosexuality ==
Ernst Röhm was Hitler's closest friend—one of the few people who called him "Adolf". Hitler continued to support him during the Röhm scandal in 1931–1932 in which the Münchener Post disclosed Röhm's homosexuality, but historian Laurie Marhoefer argues that this is not evidence of Hitler's homosexuality. Historian Andrew Wackerfuss, in Stormtrooper Families, argues that Hitler had no personal discomfort with homosexuality, but that he found it convenient politically to instrumentalise homophobia to justify the 1934 Night of the Long Knives.

Despite the fact that Hitler had previously tolerated the homosexuality of Röhm and other SA leaders, the charges of immorality were effective in gaining the support of the German population for the political murders in 1934. In August 1941, Hitler declared that "homosexuality is actually as infectious and as dangerous as the plague", and supported SS leader Heinrich Himmler's efforts to remove gay men from both the military and the SS. Homosexuality was not one of Hitler's priorities, compared to the Jewish question. The Nazi Party held anti-homosexual views, declaring in 1928 that "anyone who even thinks of homosexual love is our enemy." Hitler's regime persecuted homosexuals, sending an estimated 5,000 to 15,000 to concentration camps; some 2,500 to 7,500 of these died.

Hermann Rauschning claimed to have seen in Hitler's First World War military record an item concerning a court-martial that found Hitler guilty of pederastic practices with an officer. Rauschning also claimed that in Munich, Hitler was found guilty of a violation of Paragraph 175, which dealt with pederasty. No evidence of either of these two charges has been found.

== Wartime reports ==
In 1943, the U.S. Office of Strategic Services (OSS) received A Psychological Analysis of Adolf Hitler: His Life and Legend by Walter C. Langer, commissioned to help the Allies understand the dictator. The report, later expanded into book form as The Mind of Adolf Hitler: The Secret Wartime Report (1972), describes Hitler as having repressed homosexual tendencies and states that he was an impotent coprophile. Psychologist Henry Murray wrote a separate psychoanalytical report for OSS also in 1943, entitled Analysis of the Personality of Adolph Hitler: With Predictions of His Future Behavior and Suggestions for Dealing with Him Now and After Germany's Surrender. He also dealt with Hitler's alleged coprophilia, but overall diagnosed Hitler a schizophrenic. One of Hitler's opponents in the Nazi Party, Otto Strasser, told OSS interrogators that the Nazi dictator forced Geli Raubal to urinate and defecate on him. Kershaw contends that stories circulated by Strasser as to alleged "sexual deviant practices ought to be viewed as... anti-Hitler propaganda."

== Recent research and commentary ==
In research following his death, a variety of claims have been made about Hitler's sexuality: that he was gay, bisexual, or asexual, or may have engaged in sexual activity with Geli Raubal. Jack Nusan Porter of the University of Massachusetts Lowell wrote in 1998: "Did Hitler despise homosexuals? Was he ashamed of his own homosexual identity? These are areas of psychohistory that are beyond known knowledge. My own feelings are that Hitler was asexual in the traditional sense and had bizarre sexual fetishes."

Historian Lothar Machtan argues in The Hidden Hitler (2001) that Hitler was homosexual. The book speculates about Hitler's experiences in Vienna with young friends, his adult relationships with (among others) Röhm, Hanfstaengl, and Emil Maurice, and includes a study of the Mend Protocol, a series of allegations made to the Munich police in the early 1920s by Hans Mend, who served with Hitler during World War I. American journalist Ron Rosenbaum is highly critical of Machtan's work, saying his "evidence falls short of being conclusive and often falls far short of being evidence at all." Most scholarly works dismiss Machtan's claims. In 2004, HBO produced a documentary film based on Machtan's theory, titled Hidden Führer: Debating the Enigma of Hitler's Sexuality.

Volker Ullrich proposes that Hitler occasionally had sexual relations with women but he was inexperienced as a lover and mostly uninterested or unable to relate to the experience of his female lovers in bed, and therefore not particularly prolific romantically. He notes some comments: "He couldn't kiss," said Charlotte Bechstein, the 15-year-old daughter of one of Hitler's patronesses in the early 1920s; Maria Reiter commented, "He didn't know what he was doing."

In 2025, blood from the sofa in Hitler's study was used by Turi King of the University of Bath for DNA analysis. The blood was confirmed to be Hitler's by comparing it to that of a relative. Analysis of the genetic material revealed that he had genetic markers for Kallmann syndrome, a genetic disorder that prevents a person from starting or fully completing puberty. Many males with the syndrome have an undescended testicle and 10 percent have a micropenis; most have low testosterone levels. Kallmann syndrome has the additional symptom of a total lack of sense of smell or a reduced sense of smell, among other symptoms.

== Relationships and possible relationships ==
Hitler's name has been linked romantically with a number of women:

Name	Life	Cause of death	Contact with Hitler	Information
Stefanie Rabatsch	1887–1975	Natural causes	1905–09	Rabatsch was an Austrian woman who, according to Hitler's childhood friend August Kubizek, was an unrequited love of the teenage Hitler. Kubizek's memoir is the only source for this story.
Charlotte Lobjoie	1898–1951	Unknown	1916–17	Alleged lovers; her son Jean-Marie Loret claimed that Hitler was his father. The dominant view, expressed by historians such as Anton Joachimsthaler, Ian Kershaw, and Belgian journalist Jean-Paul Mulders, is that Hitler's paternity of Loret is unlikely or impossible.
Erna Hanfstaengl	1885–1981	Natural causes	1922–23	Erna was the elder sister of Ernst Hanfstaengl and an acquaintance of Hitler. In the days following the failed Beer Hall Putsch, it was rumoured that they had sex at a country house in Uffing and that they were to be engaged. These allegations were later proven false.
Geli Raubal	1908–1931	Suicide	1925–31	Raubal, who was Hitler's half-niece, lived in his apartment from 1925 until her suicide in 1931. It is speculated that they were lovers.
Maria Reiter	1911–1992	Natural causes; attempted suicide by hanging in 1928	1925–38	Reiter may have been romantically involved with Hitler in the late 1920s. His sister Paula Hitler allegedly later said that Reiter was the only woman who might have curbed his destructive impulses.
Unity Mitford	1914–1948	Complications related to her 1939 suicide attempt	1934–39	Mitford was a British socialite and member of the Mitford family. She was a prominent supporter of Nazism, fascism, and antisemitism, and was a member of Hitler's circle.
Winifred Wagner	1897–1980	Natural causes	1923–45	Wagner was a friend and supporter of Hitler, and the two maintained a regular correspondence. Around 1933, there were rumours that she and Hitler were to marry.
Eva Braun	1912–1945	Double suicide with Hitler	1929–45	Braun was the longtime companion of Hitler and briefly his wife. They met in Munich when she was a 17-year-old assistant and model for his personal photographer, Heinrich Hoffmann. She began seeing Hitler often about two years later.
Sigrid von Laffert	1916–2002	Natural causes	early 1935	Rumoured to be romantically involved with Hitler during his time with Eva Braun. Von Laffert was a member of a patrician family. She accompanied Hitler to the Deutsche Oper Berlin in 1935, when she was aged 19. Von Laffert married German diplomat Johannes von Welczek Jr. in 1940.

== See also ==
- Possible monorchism of Adolf Hitler
- Psychopathography of Adolf Hitler

== Bibliography ==
- Allen, Peter (17 February 2012). "Hitler had son with French teen". The Telegraph. Telegraph Media Group.
- Bach, Steven (2007). Leni: The Life and Work of Leni Riefenstahl. New York; Toronto: Alfred A. Knopf. ISBN 978-0-375-40400-9.
- Beevor, Antony (2002). Berlin: The Downfall 1945. New York: Viking-Penguin. ISBN 978-0-670-03041-5.
- Boehm U, Bouloux PM, Dattani MT, de Roux N, Dodé C, Dunkel L, Dwyer AA, Giacobini P, Hardelin JP, Juul A, Maghnie M, Pitteloud N, Prevot V, Raivio T, Tena-Sempere M, Quinton R, Young J (September 2015). "Expert consensus document: European Consensus Statement on congenital hypogonadotropic hypogonadism--pathogenesis, diagnosis and treatment". Nature Reviews. Endocrinology. 11 (9): 547–64. doi:10.1038/nrendo.2015.112. hdl:11567/821921. PMID 26194704.
- Bright, Martin (13 May 2002). "Unity Mitford and 'Hitler's baby'". New Statesman. Progressive Media International.
- Brubach, Holly (12 October 2011). "Romancing the Reich". T Magazine.
- Bullock, Alan (1999) [1952]. Hitler: A Study in Tyranny. New York: Konecky & Konecky. ISBN 978-1-56852-036-0.
- Connolly, Kate (14 February 2010). "Nazi loyalist and Adolf Hitler's devoted aide: the true story of Eva Braun". The Observer. Guardian News and Media.
- Evans, Richard J. (2005). The Third Reich in Power. New York: Penguin Group. ISBN 978-0-14-303790-3.
- Evans, Richard J. (2008). The Third Reich at War. New York: Penguin Group. ISBN 978-0-14-311671-4.
- Galante, Pierre; Silianoff, Eugene (1989). Voices From the Bunker. New York: G. P. Putnam's Sons. ISBN 978-0-3991-3404-3.
- Giles, Geoffrey J. (2010). "The Persecution of Gay Men and Lesbians During the Third Reich". The Routledge History of the Holocaust. Routledge. pp. 385–396. ISBN 978-0-203-83744-3.
- Görtemaker, Heike B. (2010). Eva Braun: Leben mit Hitler (in German). München: C.H.Beck. ISBN 978-3-406-58514-2.
- Görtemaker, Heike B. (2011). Eva Braun: Life with Hitler. New York: Alfred A. Knopf. ISBN 978-0-307-59582-9.
- Gunther, John (1940). Inside Europe. New York: Harper & Brothers. OCLC 836676034.
- Hamilton, Charles (1984). Leaders & Personalities of the Third Reich, Vol. 1. R. James Bender Publishing. ISBN 978-0-912138-27-5.
- Hamann, Brigitte (2005). Winifred Wagner: A Life at the Heart of Hitler's Bayreuth. Granta. ISBN 978-1-86207-671-6.
- Hanfstaengl, Ernst (1957). Hitler: The Missing Years. London: Eyre & Spottiswoode.
- Joachimsthaler, Anton (1989). Korrektur einer Biographie : Adolf Hitler, 1908–1920 [Emendation of a Biography. Adolf Hitler, 1908–1920] (in German). München: Herbig. ISBN 978-3-7766-1575-3.
- Joachimsthaler, Anton (1999) [1995]. The Last Days of Hitler: The Legends – The Evidence – The Truth. London: Brockhampton Press. ISBN 978-1-86019-902-8.
- Kershaw, Ian (2001). Hitler 1889–1936: Hubris. London: Penguin. ISBN 978-0-14-192579-0.
- Kershaw, Ian (2008). Hitler: A Biography. New York City: W. W. Norton & Company. ISBN 978-0-393-06757-6. LCCN 2008037294. OCLC 1285564274. OL 22551194M. Wikidata Q138306767.
- Kubizek, August (2011) [1954]. The Young Hitler I Knew: The Memoirs of Hitler's Childhood Friend. Barnsley, West Yorkshire: Greenhill/Frontline. ISBN 978-1-84832-607-1.
- Langer, Walter C. (1943). A Psychological Profile of Adolph Hitler. His Life and Legend. Washington, D.C.: Office of Strategic Services. OCLC 6061022. Archived from the original on 28 August 2005.
- Langer, Walter C. (1972). The Mind of Adolf Hitler: The Secret Wartime Report. New York: Basic Books. ISBN 978-0-465-04620-1. LCCN 72-86336.
- Large, David Clay (1997). Where Ghosts Walked: Munich's Road to the Third Reich. New York: W. W. Norton & Company. ISBN 978-0-393-03836-1.
- Larson, Eric (2011). In the Garden of Beasts: Love, Terror, and an American Family in Hitler's Berlin. New York: Crown Publishers. ISBN 978-0-307-40884-6.
- Linge, Heinz (2009). With Hitler to the End. Frontline Books–Skyhorse Publishing. ISBN 978-1-60239-804-7.
- Marhoefer, Laurie (2015). Sex and the Weimar Republic: German Homosexual Emancipation and the Rise of the Nazis. University of Toronto Press. ISBN 978-1-4426-1957-9.
- Murray, Henry A. (October 1943). "Analysis of the Personality of Adolph Hitler: With Predictions of His Future Behavior and Suggestions for Dealing with Him Now and After Germany's Surrender" (PDF). Harvard Psychological Clinic. Archived from the original (PDF) on 16 June 2012.
- Nagorski, Andrew (2012). Hitlerland: American Eyewitnesses to the Nazi Rise to Power. New York: Simon and Schuster.
- Oltermann, Philip (13 November 2025). "Did Hitler really have a 'micropenis'? The dubious documentary analysing the dictator's DNA". The Guardian.
- Porter, Jack Nusan (10 October 1998). "Homosexuals, Genocide of in the Holocaust". Center for Holocaust & Genocide Studies, University of Minnesota.
- Rosenbaum, Ron (1998). Explaining Hitler: The Search for the Origins of His Evil. New York; Toronto: Random House. ISBN 978-0-679-43151-0.
- Rosenbaum, Ron (3 December 2001). "Queer as Volk? A new book claims Hitler was a closet case". Slate. The Slate Group.
- Shirer, William Lawrence (1960). The Rise and Fall of the Third Reich: A History of Nazi Germany. New York City: Simon & Schuster. ASIN B0766DKDLR. LCCN 60006729. OCLC 1286630. OL 5794925M. Wikidata Q138029595.
- Speer, Albert (1971). Inside the Third Reich. New York: Avon. ISBN 978-0-380-00071-5.
- Staff (29 June 1959). "Foreign News: Uneven Romance". TIME. New York: Time Inc. Archived from the original on 28 March 2008.(subscription required)
- Staff (24 April 2008). "Hitler had geen joods bloed en geen Franse zoon" [Hitler had no Jewish blood and no French son]. Het Laatste Nieuws (in Dutch).
- Ullrich, Volker (2016). Hitler: Ascent, 1889-1939. New York: Alfred A. Knopf. ISBN 978-0-385-35438-7.
- Wackerfuss, Andrew (2015). Stormtrooper Families: Homosexuality and Community in the Early Nazi Movement. Harrington Park Press. ISBN 978-1-939594-06-8.
- Vernon, W. H. D (July 1942). "Hitler, the man – Notes for a case history". Journal of Abnormal and Social Psychology. 37 (3). Washington: American Psychological Association: 295–308. doi:10.1037/h0059954.
