= Hamann =

People with the German surname Hamann include:

== Politicians and military personnel ==
- A. P. Hamann (1909–1977), American politician
- Adolf Hamann (1885–1945), German Nazi general executed for war crimes
- Augusto Hamann Rademaker Grünewald (1905–1985), Brazilian admiral and politician
- Joachim Hamann (1913–1945), Nazi officer, Holocaust perpetrator
- Karl Hamann (1903–1973), Liberal politician in the Communist German Democratic Republic
- Sibylle Hamann (born 1966), German politician

== Authors and media people ==
- Brigitte Hamann (1940–2016), German-Austrian historian
- Craig Hamann, American film director, screenwriter and actor
- Evelyn Hamann (1942–2007), German actress
- Hilary Thayer Hamann (born 1962), American author
- Ilene Hamann (born 1984), South African actress and model
- Jack Hamann (born 1954), American television correspondent and author
- Johann Georg Hamann (1730–1788), German philosopher
- Richard Hamann (1879–1961), German art historian

== Sportspeople ==
=== Association football ===
- Dietmar Hamann (born 1973), German footballer, coach and pundit
- Erich Hamann (born 1944), East German footballer and manager
- Matthias Hamann (born 1968), German footballer

=== Basketball ===
- Ray Hamann (1911–2005), American basketball player, mostly for the Oshkosh All-Stars
- Steffen Hamann (born 1981), German basketball player

=== Other sports ===
- Birgit Hamann (born 1969), German hurdler
- Conny Hamann (born 1969), Danish handball player
- Doc Hamann (1900–1973), baseball player
- Helmut Hamann (1912–1941), German 400 metres runner
- Lars Hamann (born 1989), German javelin thrower
- Monika Hamann (born 1954), East German sprinter
- Svend Hamann (born 1940), Danish chess master

== Other ==
- Christel Hamann (1847–1948), German inventor of mechanical calculators, etc.
- Johanna Hamann (1954–2017), Peruvian sculptor
- John Hamann (born 1962), local celebrity from Milwaukee, Wisconsin, United States, known as Milverine
- Stephan Hamann, American psychology professor

== See also ==
- Hamann Motorsport
