= Stefanie Rabatsch =

Alleged love-interest of Adolf Hitler (1887–1975)

- Rabatsch in 1907
- Born: Stefanie Maria Beata Isak; 26 December 1887; Niemes, Bohemia, Austria-Hungary
- Died: 22 December 1975 (aged 87)
- Known for: Alleged love-interest of Adolf Hitler
- Spouse: Maximilian Rabatsch (m. 1910)

Stefanie Rabatsch (née Isak; 26 December 1887 – 22 December 1975) was an Austrian woman who was allegedly an unrequited love of then-teenage Adolf Hitler, a claim made by Hitler's childhood friend August Kubizek. Her Jewish-sounding maiden name, Isak, has been subject to speculation in this context. However, there is no evidence apart from Kubizek that Hitler ever had such an attachment.

Kubizek, a childhood friend and later biographer of his childhood experience with Hitler, wrote about Stefanie in his book, Adolf Hitler, My Childhood Friend. He alleges that Hitler fell in love with her after she passed by him during her daily daughter-mother stroll in Linz, glancing at him. In Kubizek's account, although in love with her nearly to the point of suicide, Adolf Hitler never once spoke with her, and she later married an Austrian army officer. Stefanie stated in interviews that she was unaware of Hitler's feelings towards her. She was buried on 9 January 1976 in Kalksburg, Vienna.

The one-sided relationship has been discussed in many books. Some question the accuracy of Kubizek's memoir, the only source for the story. Others accept that there is some basis of fact, but downplay the significance of the youthful infatuation, while yet others consider that it gives valuable insight into the development of Hitler's personality.

== Background ==
August Kubizek, a music student from Linz, first met Hitler when the two were competing for a place to stand during an opera performance. According to him, Hitler's passion for Stefanie began in spring 1905, when he was 16 and attending school in Linz, and she was 17; and lasted until 1909, when he was 20. (Note: Historian Brigitte Hamann believes It is more likely to have begun in spring 1906, by which time he had dropped out of school.) Kubizek describes the first time he heard about Hitler's obsession as follows: "One evening in the spring of 1905, as we were taking our usual stroll, Adolf gripped my arm and asked me excitedly what I thought of that slim blonde girl walking along the Landstrasse arm-in-arm with her mother. 'You must know, I'm in love with her,' he added resolutely."

Stefanie Maria Beata Isak was born on 26 December 1887 in Niemes, Bohemia, Austria-Hungary (today Mimoň, Czech Republic). She came from a family of higher social class than Hitler's and was more than a year older than him. Stefanie had returned to Linz after professional training in Munich and Geneva. She had a brother, Karl Richard Isak, who was studying law in Vienna. In the 1950s, Dr. Franz Jetzinger had two pictures of Stefanie in her youth, one from 1904 and one in ball dress from 1907. Kubizek describes her as "a distinguished-looking girl, tall and slim. She had thick fair hair, which she mostly wore swept back in a bun. Her eyes were very beautiful".

== Alleged interaction with Hitler ==
According to Kubizek, Hitler never spoke to Stefanie, always saying he would do so "tomorrow". Kubizek wrote that Hitler loathed those who flirted with her, especially the military officers, whom he called "conceited blockheads"; he came to feel an "uncompromising enmity towards the officer class as a whole, and everything military in general. It annoyed him that Stefanie mixed with such idlers who, he insisted, wore corsets and used scent".

Hitler insisted that Kubizek stalk Stefanie and delivered daily reports on her activity while he was away visiting his mother or family. In one report, Kubizek wrote that Stefanie loved to dance and had taken lessons. Hitler disliked dancing and reportedly replied, "Stefanie only dances because she is forced to by society on which she unfortunately depends. Once Stefanie is my wife, she won't have the slightest desire to dance!" In June 1906, Stefanie allegedly gave Hitler a smile and a flower from her bouquet as she was passing him in her carriage. Kubizek later described the scene:

"Never again did I see Adolf as happy as he was at that moment. When the carriage had passed he dragged me aside and with emotion he gazed at the flower, this visible pledge of her love. I can still hear his voice, trembling with excitement, 'She loves me!' "

After Hitler's mother Klara died of breast cancer in 1907, the funeral procession went through Urfahr to Leonding. Kubizek remarks that Hitler said he had seen Stefanie at the funeral procession, which gave him some consolation. Kubizek claims that "Stefanie had no idea how deeply Adolf was in love with her; she regarded him as a somewhat shy, but nevertheless remarkably tenacious and faithful, admirer. When she responded with a smile to his inquiring glance, he was happy and his mood became unlike anything I had ever observed in him. But when Stefanie, as happened just as often, coldly ignored his gaze, he was crushed and ready to destroy himself and the whole world."

Kubizek claims that Hitler finally stated he planned to kidnap Stefanie and kill both her and himself by jumping off a bridge into the Danube. Instead he moved to Vienna, where, according to Kubizek, an idealised image of Stefanie became his moral touchstone. Stefanie stated in later interviews that she was unaware of Hitler at the time, but that she had received an anonymous love letter asking her to wait for him to graduate and then to marry him, which she only realised after being questioned about him, must have been from Hitler. She recalled: "I once received a letter from someone who said they were to attend the Academy of Arts, and that I should wait for him; he could come back and marry me! I had no idea who the letter might have been from or who I should have send it to." At Christmas in 1913, when he was living in Munich, Hitler was said to have placed an anonymous personal ad in the Linz newspaper with his best wishes to her, but she was already married and in Vienna by then.

== Later years ==
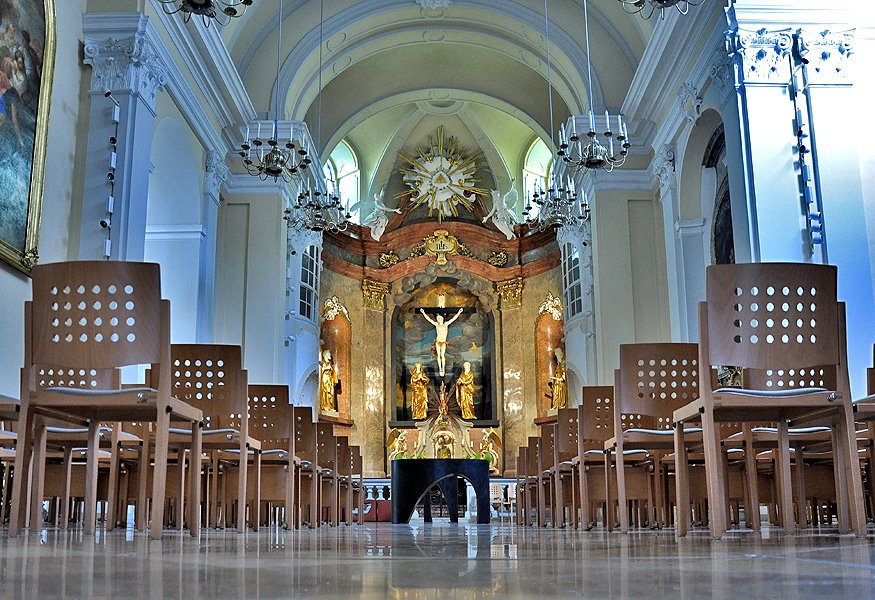
St. Gertrud, Vienna, where Stefanie was married to Maximilian Rabatsch

Little is known about Stefanie's overall life. She became engaged in 1908 to an officer in the Hessian regiment stationed in Linz. On 24 October 1910, Stefanie married Maximilian Rabatsch (* 1872 in Vienna), sixteen years older than her, in Vienna in St. Gertrud, Gertrudplatz 5, in the parish of Währing. Maximilian was appointed captain on 1 November 1909. He was promoted to major on 1 October 1917 and to colonel on 1 August 1918. According to Kubizek, her husband became a high-ranking officer, she was widowed on 15 July 1942, and after the end of World War II (1939–45) she lived in Vienna.

Stefanie was interviewed and Hitler's alleged love for her dramatised in a 1973 Austro-German television film called A Young Man From the Innviertel. She could not understand why Hitler, if he felt so strongly, had not given her any indication of his attachment, saying, "Hitler would hardly have suffered from too much shyness".

== Maiden name ==
Stefanie's maiden name, Isak, sounds Jewish, although she was not Jewish. Kubizek spelled it Isaak. The correct spelling was identified by German historian Anton Joachimsthaler in his 2003 work Hitlers Liste: Ein Dokument persönlicher Beziehungen (Munich, 2003, pp. 46–52). Some historians opine that Hitler would have assumed Stefanie was of Jewish origin. American historian Graeme Donald believes Hitler would have inferred that she was Jewish, but saw no problems with this at the time because his notoric and radical antisemitsm started some years later. This view is supported by Joachimsthaler, who stated in a BBC interview that Hitler must have assumed she was Jewish because of her Jewish-sounding surname.

== Scholarly reactions ==
The role of Rabatsch in Hitler's life has been widely studied. Sherree Owens Zalampas, in a book analyzing the relationship between Hitler's views on art and his psychology, notes that the stories about Rabatsch have been rejected by some scholars and accepted by others. Among those who reject stories about Rabatsch are Franz Jetzinger and Bradley F. Smith. Bradley F. Smith discussed the story in his 1967 Adolf Hitler; his family, childhood, and youth. Franz Jetzinger discussed the story in his 1958 Hitler's Youth. Jetzinger attacked Kubizek in his book, but confirmed that Stefanie existed although she did not at the time know of the alleged infatuation. In Jetzinger's analysis, Kubizek overstates the relationship between Rabatsch and Hitler, and some of the interactions Kubizek describes are impossible given the timelines of their lives, and the focus of biographers on the relationship represents a misguided attempt to fabricate an early "love interest" for Hitler. Werner Maser agrees with this view in his 1971 Adolf Hitler: Legende, Mythos, Wirklichkeit, and suggests that Hitler's behavior towards Rabatsch was typical for Austrian adolescents of his era.

Zalampas notes that Kubizek claims that Hitler was interested in Rabatsch's singing voice, which Kubizek claimed was a soprano, and its suitability for singing Wagnerian roles. She suggests that Hitler had a fantasy view of Stefanie which is indicative of the young Hitler's mixing of reality and fantasy and his views about art, war, the novels of Karl May, and Wagnerian themes. Robert G. L. Waite in his 1993 The Psychopathic God writes that Rabatsch "served as a defense against feelings of sexual inadequacy." He suggests that Hitler feared interacting with Rabatsch in person, since her reality may fall short of the ideal of Germanic virtue which Hitler had fantasized she represented. He repeats Kubizek's belief that Hitler left Linz because he was unable to bear remaining in the same place as Rabatsch.

Kubizek's story has been touched on by a number of other writers. William L. Shirer drew on Kubizek's account of the one-sided romance in his 1960 The Rise and Fall of the Third Reich. In 1973, Der Spiegel reported that the German and Austrian broadcasters ZDF and ORF had produced a TV docudrama on Hitler's youth that portrayed the story of his infatuation with Stefanie Rabatsch. Brigitte Hamann draws on the story in her 2010 Hitler's Vienna: A Portrait of the Tyrant as a Young Man. Rose Montero draws on Kubizek's account in her 2013 Dictadoras: Las mujeres de los hombres más despiadados de la historia. Danielle Zumbo cites Kubizek in her 2013 Operazione Stalingrado: Storia di un eroe.

Hugh Trevor-Roper considered Kubizek's memoirs to be a valuable examination of Hitler's early life, and said, "... it will have an important place among the source books of history." Ian Kershaw relates the story in his 2008 Hitler: A Biography. Kershaw felt that Kubizek had been helped in creating his book by a ghostwriter. He considers the story of Stefanie exaggerated, writing, "There can be little doubt that Kubizek greatly embellishes what was at most a passing juvenile infatuation." However, Kershaw concludes that although Kubizek's book has weaknesses it also has intrinsic value as a portrait of the young Hitler. Frederic Spotts in his 2009 Hitler and the Power of Aesthetics notes that no documentation or sources other than Kubizek's book provide any substantiation for the alleged infatuation.

== See also ==
- Sexuality of Adolf Hitler
