= Hidden Führer: Debating the Enigma of Hitler's Sexuality =

- DVD cover
- Directed by: Fenton Bailey; Randy Barbato
- Country of origin: United States
- Original language: English

Production
- Producer: Gabriel Rotello
- Editor: Blake West
- Running time: 90 minutes

Original release
- Release: 2004

Hidden Führer: Debating the Enigma of Hitler's Sexuality is a documentary film based on the research of German professor Lothar Machtan for his 2001 book The Hidden Hitler that claimed Adolf Hitler was a homosexual. Aired by HBO's CINEMAX Reel Life, the 90 minute documentary was directed by Fenton Bailey, Randy Barbato and Gabriel Rotello and was produced by Gabriel Rotello.

Other interviews in the documentary include those with:

- Geoffrey Giles, author of a study of gays in the Nazi party, professor at the University of Florida
- Brigitte Hamann, German historian and author
- Ron Rosenbaum, author of Explaining Hitler
- Ralf Dose, German gay historian and founder of the Magnus Hirschfeld Society
- Michelangelo Signorile, gay activist author

== Reception ==
Of the film, a Variety review called it "a platform for taking Machtan's argument seriously." Matthew Gilbert of The Boston Globe stated "It's a more cerebral and conventional documentary", dull and "poorly balanced scale". Andrea Gronvall of Chicago Reader said "sketchy evidence" and "transforming gossip into entertainment".

== Controversy ==
Most mainstream historians and surviving eyewitnesses dispute Machtan's argument (see Sexuality of Adolf Hitler).
