= John F. Andrews =

American literary scholar (born 1942)

John F. Andrews, OBE (November 2, 1942 – May 4, 2025) was an American Shakespeare scholar, writer, editor, educator, event producer, and founder of The Shakespeare Guild, a global nonprofit organization designed to foster a deeper appreciation of the author.

== Career ==
Andrews served as the Director of Academic Programs at the Folger Shakespeare Library from 1974 to 1985, where he redesigned and expanded the scope of Shakespeare Quarterly, supervised the Library's book-publishing operation, and helped organize and promote an eight-city touring exhibition, Shakespeare: The Globe and the World.

From 1985 to 1988, Andrews worked as deputy director of Education Programs at the NEH. In 1992–93, he produced a white paper, Aiming Higher, as a consultant for the Office of Postsecondary Education at the United States Department of Education.

In 1987, Andrews founded the Shakespeare Guild, a not-for-profit organization designed to cultivate wider and more informed audiences for William Shakespeare. In 1994, after Andrews secured the blessing of its namesake, the Guild established the Sir John Gielgud Award for Excellence in the Dramatic Arts, which has since been bestowed upon actors including Sir Ian McKellen, Dame Judi Dench, Sir Patrick Stewart; directors such as Michael Kahn; producers such as Sir Cameron Mackintosh; and other notable figures in classical theater.

In 1998, Andrews started Speaking of Shakespeare, a series of live events produced under the auspices of The Shakespeare Guild. Events. These events feature interviews and Q&A sessions with artists, journalists, authors, and other public figures at venues including the National Press Club, the National Arts Club, the Folger Shakespeare Library, the Players, the British Embassy, and other venues in several U.S. cities. During the COVID-19 pandemic, Speaking of Shakespeare events transitioned into online streaming events facilitated by the National Arts Club. These included interviews with Dame Judi Dench, Sir Ian McKellen, F. Murray Abraham, Shakespeare scholar Stephen Greenblatt, and others.

From 2001 to 2007, Andrews served as executive director of the English Speaking Union (ESU) of Washington, D.C. On June 19, 2000, during a ceremony at the British Embassy in Washington, Andrews was inducted, as an Honorary Officer, into the Most Excellent Order of the British Empire.

Andrews, in partnership with Sir Stanley Wells, Chairman of the Shakespeare Birthplace Trust, coordinated an effort that culminated in an April 26, 2022, ceremony at Westminster Abbey, during which a commemorative stone dedicated to Sir John Gielgud was unveiled within Poets' Corner. Speakers at the event included Dame Judi Dench, Sir Ian McKellen, Sir Richard Eyre, and David Hare. The Dean of Westminster, David Hoyle, presided over the event.

On July 3, 2021, Andrews was inducted into the Hall of Fame at the Carlsbad Museum in Carlsbad, New Mexico. He also serves on the Carlsbad Mayor's Cultural Development Council.

Andrews' notable publications include a three-volume Scribner's reference set, William Shakespeare: His World, His Work, His Influence; a three-volume, student-oriented companion set, Shakespeare's World and Work; The Guild Shakespeare, a 19-volume annotated compilation of Shakespeare's works for the Doubleday Book & Music Clubs; and a 16-volume paperback collection of selected plays, The Everyman Shakespeare, for J. M. Dent Publishers in London. Andrews also contributed to Ron Rosenbaum's The Shakespeare Wars. Andrews has written and spoken about Shakespeare's role in Abraham Lincoln's assassination; details from his October 1990 article in The Atlantic, "Was the Bard Behind It?" appeared on PBS in Ken Burns' The Civil War miniseries.

He taught at several universities, including University of Tennessee (1969–1970), Florida State University (1970–1974), Catholic University (1989–1990, 1995), Georgetown University (1990–1997), and George Washington University (1991).

== Personal life ==
Andrews was born in Carlsbad, New Mexico, and graduated from Carlsbad High School. He held degrees from Princeton University (A.B., 1965), Harvard University (M.A.T., 1966), and Vanderbilt University (Ph.D., 1971). Andrews lived in Santa Fe, New Mexico, with his wife, Janet A. Denton, a former policy analyst and visual artist until his death on May 4, 2025. Andrews had two adult children from his prior marriage.
