= Joyce Mushaben =

American political scientist (born 1952)

- Born: Joyce Marie Mushaben; 1952 (age 73–74); Ohio
- Occupations: Political scientist, women's and gender studies academic
- Years active: 1980-present

Joyce Mushaben (pronounced as Mus-hay-ben, born 1952) is an American political scientist. Having lived and researched in Germany for several decades, her area of expertise is in analysis of German politics and society. As a professor at the University of Missouri–St. Louis (UMSL) from 1980 to 2019, she helped found the women's studies program and served as director of the Institute for Women's and Gender Studies from 2002 to 2005. Since retiring from UMSL, she has continued research as an affiliate of Georgetown University.

== Early life and education ==
Joyce Marie Mushaben was born in Ohio in 1952 to Elaine (née Ober) and Howard J. Mushaben. She graduated from Archbishop McNicholas High School of Cincinnati, as the class salutatorian in 1970. After graduation, Mushaben moved to Germany and attended the University of Hamburg from 1971 to 1973, before moving to the Free University of Berlin to continue her studies until 1979. She completed her PhD at Indiana University in Bloomington in 1981 with a thesis, The State v. the University: Juridicalization and the Politics of Higher Education at the Free University of Berlin, 1969 – 1979. It explored the political culture of Germany in the decade and the influence of students on the democratization process of the university system.

== Career ==
In 1980, Mushaben was hired as an assistant professor in the political science department at the University of Missouri (UMSL) in St. Louis. Although based at UMSL, she was an itinerant scholar for several years, studying at the University of Stuttgart and Goethe University Frankfurt on a Alexander von Humboldt Fellowship in 1985 and 1986. She was promoted as an associate professor at UMSL in 1987, and was a Ford fellow at the American Institute for Contemporary German Studies in Washington, D.C. in 1989 and 1990. She worked as a research associate at Georgetown University in 1990 and 1991, and shortly thereafter, married Harry F. Few, with whom she would have children before his death in 2014. Because the university did not offer child care services after 5 P.M., Mushaben refused to teach night classes. In 1992, Mushaben entered discussions at UMSL for a promotion to full professor. Her promotion was denied and in response, Mushaben began collecting data on the salary discrepancies between men and women faculty members. Despite presenting evidence that there was a wage gap of between $8,000 and $9,000 for women faculty, Mushaben said she was told that a budget shortfall did not allow adjustments to be made. During the 1994–1995 term, she was a visiting professor at Ohio State University. She was a Fulbright lecturer the following year, at the Higher Pedagogical School in Erfurt, Germany.

Mushaben was one of the academics who founded the women's studies program at UMSL. In 2002, she became the director of the Institute for Women's and Gender Studies, and led the institute until 2005. In 2017, she became the first professor of "Global Studies in Arts and Sciences", an interdisciplinary offering at UMSL which combined courses on anthropology, political science, sociology, and other fields, to examine diversity, ethnicity, and migration in humanity. She developed the curriculum for the global studies program and was also named as a Curator's Distinguished Professor of comparative politics. She retired from UMSL in 2019, and became affiliated with the BMW Center for German & European Studies of Georgetown University, and an adjunct professor at the Institute for the Study of International Migration, an affiliate of the Georgetown University Law Center in Washington, D.C.

== Research ==
Some of Mushaben's works like From Post-War to Post-Wall Generations, examined the meaning of German national identity and how that shaped foreign policy in the Cold War and reunification periods. The book looked at the connections between Russian and German foreign policy considerations and how they were impacted by generational change and attitudes toward NATO. She argued that unification ignited new debates on what it means to be German and that the three generations born after World War II had different views on national security and peace. In similar works, she examined the West German economy and how the stagnation and unemployment of the 1970s and 1980s led to dissatisfaction of a large segment of the population and caused younger adults to turn away from the more traditional political parties, such as the Christian Democratic Union of Germany, the Christian Social Union in Bavaria, the Free Democratic Party, and the Social Democratic Party of Germany. Grassroots activism rose in numbers that had not been present in previous German decades, causing rifts between the governments, who saw their activities as disruptive and potentially threatening to authority. As a result a push arose to replace career politicians with people more sympathetic to the wants of their constituencies, such as the West German Green Party, which were critical of maintaining the economic status quo. She also argued in articles such as "Be Careful What You Pray for: Employment Profiles among East and West Germans", that East Germans were more adaptable than their western counterparts after unification because they had already gone through many structural changes, making them resilient, flexible and more willing to take risks.

Mushaben's works also analyzed feminist positions and their differences between East and West German women and she concluded that East German women lost more from the unification process than women in the west, because abortion, childcare provisions and job protections were eliminated with unification. In analyzing women's issues and how they were handled by the government, Mushaben has evaluated the red–green alliance of the Greens and Social Democrats which led the way toward adopting more women-friendly policies in the 1990s and early 2000s. She has investigated the Muslim population and how it is perceived by some feminists as not compatible with German identity because of issues such as forcing women to wear headscarves or marry. In Mushaben's analysis, German feminists failure to grasp that headscarves worn by Muslim women are not merely signs of their patriarchal oppression, but an expression of their right to free expression. She argued that Muslim women in Germany, and Europe more generally, would eventually modify their own gender relationships without the state needing to intervene. She has also written a biography of former German Chancellor Angela Merkel and compared her leadership trajectory with that of Hillary Clinton, former United States Secretary of State, Senator, and First Lady. Scholars Patricia Anne Simpson and Eric Langenbacher stated that stereotypes of women politicians disadvantaged both Merkel and Clinton, forcing them to publicly downplay gender's role in their leadership decisions, while simultaneously implementing policies which created positive changes based upon gender. Simpson called Mushaben's biography of Merkel, the "first study of its kind", which academic Jennifer Yoder concurred was because Mushaben examined the influences in her background which formed Merkel's focus and style as a leader and policy-maker. Yoder stated that Mushaben's expertise in analysis of German politics and society allowed her to examine Merkel's "cautious and consensus-driven" approach to policy, power, and representation through a gendered lens, which transformed the country after the fall of the Berlin Wall.

== Selected works ==
- Mushaben, Joyce Marie (May 1981). The State v. the University: Juridicalization and the Politics of Higher Education at the Free University of Berlin, 1969 – 1979 (PhD). Bloomington, Indiana: Indiana University Bloomington. OCLC 8329983. ProQuest 303137570.
- Mushaben, Joyce M. (1993). Identity Without a Hinterland?: Continuity and Change in National Consciousness in the German Democratic Republic, 1949–1989. Washington, D.C.: American Institute for Contemporary German Studies. OCLC 63540998.
- Mushaben, Joyce; Giles, Geoffrey; Lennox, Sara (1997). "4. Women, Men and Unification: Gender Politics and the Abortion Struggle since 1989". In Jarausch, Konrad (ed.). After Unity: Reconfiguring German Identities. New York, New York: Berghahn Books. pp. 137–172. ISBN 978-1-57181-040-3.
- Mushaben, Joyce Marie (1998). From Post-War to Post-Wall Generations: Changing Attitudes towards the National Question and NATO in the Federal Republic of Germany. Boulder, Colorado: Westview Press. ISBN 978-0-8133-1152-4.
- Mushaben, Joyce Marie (2005). "8. More Than Just a Bad-Hair Day: The Head-Scarf Debate as a Challenge to Euro-National Identities". In Henke, Holger (ed.). Crossing Over: Comparing Recent Migration in the United States and Europe. Lanham, Maryland: Lexington Books. pp. 182–220. ISBN 978-0-7391-0961-8.
- Mushaben, Joyce Marie (July 2006). "Girl Power and Gender Mainstreaming: Looking for Peace in New Places Through a European Union Lens". Peace & Change. 31 (3). Hoboken, New Jersey: Wiley-Blackwell: 368–389. doi:10.1111/j.1468-0130.2006.00379.x. ISSN 0149-0508. OCLC 822525663.
- Mushaben, Joyce Marie (2008). The Changing Faces of Citizenship: Social Integration and Political Mobilization among Ethnic Minorities in Germany. New York, New York: Berghahn Books. ISBN 978-1-84545-453-1.
- Abels, Gabriele; Joyce, Mushaben, eds. (2012). Gendering the European Union: New Approaches to Old Democratic Deficits (1st ed.). Basingstoke, Hampshire: Palgrave Macmillan. ISBN 978-1-349-33360-8.
- Mushaben, Joyce Marie (2017). Becoming Madam Chancellor: Angela Merkel and the Berlin Republic. Cambridge, Cambridgeshire: Cambridge University Press. ISBN 978-1-108-40563-8.
- Mushaben, Joyce Marie (2023). What Remains? The Dialectical Identities of Eastern Germans. Cham, Switzerland: Palgrave Macmillan. ISBN 978-3-031-18887-9.
