= Meldemannstraße dormitory =

Former men's dormitory in Vienna

Coordinates: 48°14′22″N 16°22′44″E

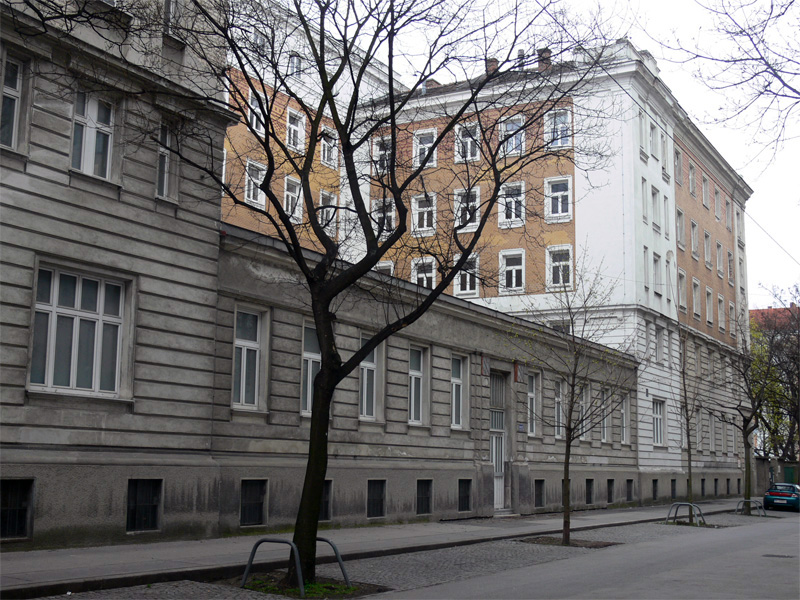
Front view

The dormitory at 27 Meldemannstraße in Brigittenau district, Vienna, Austria was a public dormitory for men (Männerwohnheim) from 1905 to 2003. It is a subject of public interest primarily because from 1910 to 1913, it was the residence of Adolf Hitler, who later became dictator of Nazi Germany.

== The dormitory in the 1900s ==
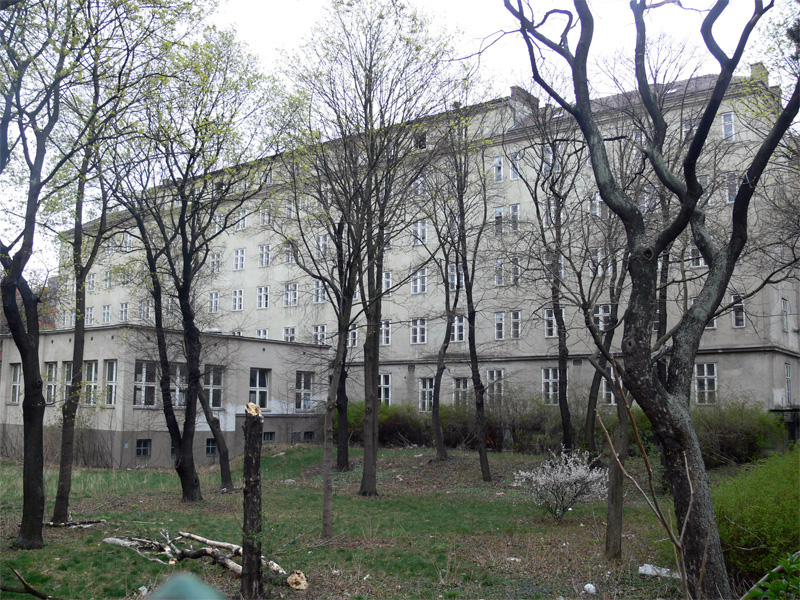
Back view from Pasettistraße

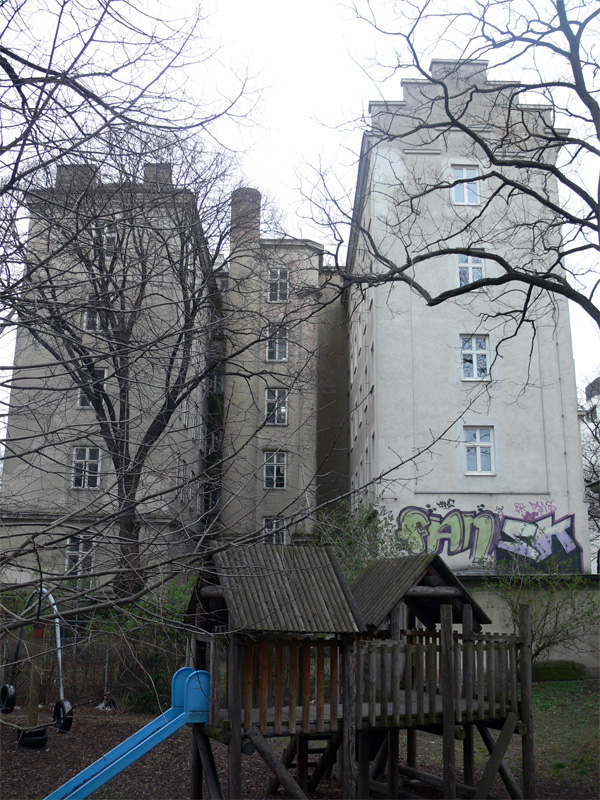
Side view from Stromstraße

The construction of the dormitory in 1905 was financed by the 'Emperor Franz Joseph I Jubilee Fund for Public Housing and Welfare Facilities,' which was funded by donations and received substantial contributions from Jewish families, especially Baron Nathaniel Rothschild and the Gutmann family. It was a private charitable foundation which aimed at reducing the number of Bettgeher ("bed-goers") in Vienna. Bettgeher were poor people with no fixed abode, often shift workers from the countryside, who paid a small fee for the use of a bed in a private house for a few hours during the day. In 1910, they numbered 80,000 in Vienna, and were regarded as a threat to the morals of the host family.

The six-story dormitory was among the most modern facilities of its kind when it opened in 1905. It was lit by gas lamps and light bulbs, and heated by a modern steam heater. On the ground floor, it featured a mess hall, a reading room with daily newspapers and a library. The underground floor held cleaning rooms, a luggage room, a bicycle storage room as well as a shoemaker's and a tailor's workshop. Moreover, the dormitory included a sick room with a resident physician, a disinfection chamber for the de-lousing of new residents, washrooms, a shaving room and a bathroom with sixteen showers and four bathtubs.

The actual sleeping quarters were located on the upper four stories. Each of the up to 544 residents had a small cabin of his own, measuring 1.4 meters (4.6 ft) by 2.17 meters (7.1 ft). The cabins, which were unlocked each evening at 8 p.m. and had to be vacated by 9 a.m., had a lockable door, a lightbulb, a bed, a small table, a clothes-hanger and a mirror.

The weekly rent was 2.50 crowns, about as much as a Bettgeher would have to pay for the use of a bed, which made it very affordable for unskilled labourers or journeyman artisans with an annual income of about 1,000 crowns. When the dormitory opened, the Viennese press praised it as "fantastical quarters, a paradise on earth" and as a "wonder of elegance and inexpensiveness".

It was known to be a place where elderly males sought out the company of young men for sexual pleasure.

== Adolf Hitler's stay ==
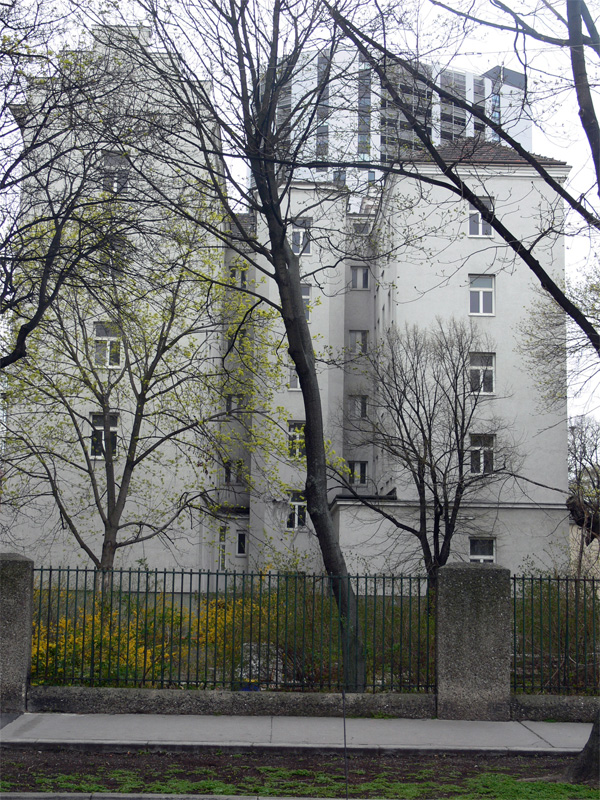
Side view from Winarskystraße

According to police registration files, Adolf Hitler – at the time unemployed and living by selling his paintings – lived in the dormitory for three years, 9 February 1910 to 24 May 1913. He had moved from a homeless shelter in Meidling, where he had stayed since December 1909. He moved to Munich in 1913 after receiving his father's inheritance.

Hitler himself appears to have provided no details about his daily life in Vienna, but several of his co-residents later published their recollections of Hitler's stay in the dormitory. They report that he read the newspapers each morning in the non-smoking area of the reading room, where he also painted, discussed politics with other residents and gave speeches.

Among the men who wrote about Hitler's residence in the dormitory were Reinhold Hanisch, a vagabond and part-time labourer who died in prison in 1937 under unclear circumstances and whose recollections were published in The New Republic in 1939; one Karl Honisch who wrote a report for the Nazi party archives in 1938; Josef Greiner, a worker who published slim memoirs in 1938 and 1947; and an anonymous man who wrote reports that appeared in Czech newspapers in the 1930s.

Other co-residents of the dormitory with whom Hitler was involved included his Jewish friends Eduard Löffner and Josef Neumann, the Viennese laborer Rudolf Häusler who had moved to Munich with Hitler in 1913, and a rival painter, Karl Leidenroth.

== Later history ==
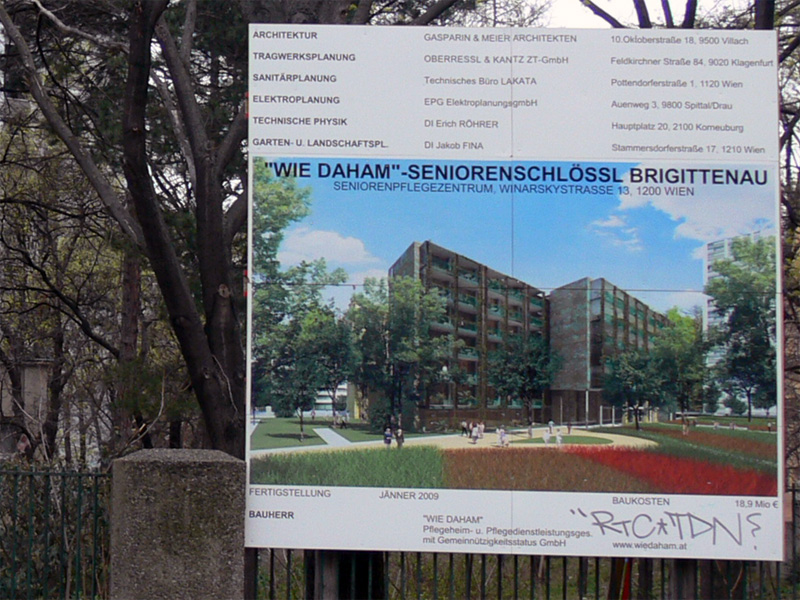
Construction sign of the retirement home project

In the 1990s, the Viennese city government decided to close the timeworn dormitory, which then served as a shelter for the homeless, in favour of a new shelter in Floridsdorf. Prior to its closure on 28 November 2003, the dormitory served in 2002 and 2003 as the venue of regular productions of George Tabori's play Mein Kampf, whose subject is Hitler's stay in Vienna.

After its closure, the building was briefly occupied by squatters. In 2007, the former dormitory was converted to a retirement home with 200 rooms, named Seniorenschlössl Brigittenau. It opened in January 2009; its entrance is on Winarskystraße.
