= Reinhold Hanisch =

Austrian business partner of Hitler (1884–1937)

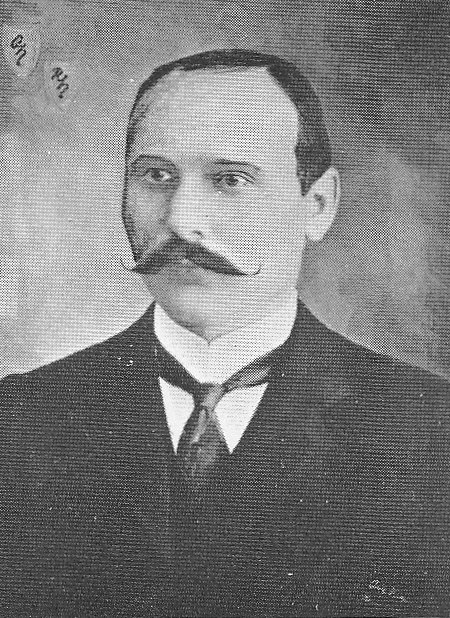
- Reinhold Hanisch, painted by Adolf Hitler, 1910
- Born: 27 January 1884; Grünwald, Bohemia
- Died: 2 February 1937 (aged 53); Vienna, Austria
- Other name: Fritz Walter
- Occupation: painter
- Known for: association with Adolf Hitler
- Spouse: Franziska Bisurek (m. 1918; div. 1928)

Reinhold Hanisch (27 January 1884, Bohemia – February 1937, Vienna) was an Austrian migrant worker and occasional business partner of the young Adolf Hitler. Hanisch, who published numerous articles on Hitler and who had lived with him in 1910, is one of the few witnesses to Hitler's Vienna years alongside August Kubizek.

== Early years (1884–1911) ==
Hanisch attended elementary school in his homeland. He descended from a low nobility family but his parents became poor and decadent. Despite his aristocratic ancestors, he hired himself out as a casual laborer and house servant. Hanisch was imprisoned in Berlin three months in 1907 for theft, and in 1908, was sentenced to six months in prison. In the autumn of 1909, he came to Vienna, where he was employed as a servant. In the Vienna homeless shelter in Meidling, where he lived, he met Hitler on 21 December 1909. In 1910, Hanisch lived with Hitler, whom he took under his wing, in the Meldemannstraße men’s dormitory. The first months of 1910 constituted a kind of Hitler-Hanisch partnership: while Hitler painted postcards and pictures, mostly watercolors, Hanisch took over their sale. The men shared equally the sums received.

Finally, Hitler split with Hanisch, accusing Hanisch of selling one of Hitler’s paintings (a view of the Vienna Parliament) and keeping the entire proceeds of the sale for himself. Hanisch denied this charge. In order to secure a new revenue stream, Hanisch began painting and became Hitler’s competitor. Hanisch supplied, among others, the Jewish frame dealer Jakob Altenberg with pictures and postcards.

On 4 August 1910, Hanisch was reported to the police by another dormitory resident, Siegfried Löffner, who was acting as Hitler's seller. The Vienna police discovered that Hanisch was registered in Vienna under the false name of Fritz Walter. On 11 August 1910, a Viennese court sentenced Hanisch to seven days in prison.

== Later years (1912–1937) ==
Reinhold Hanisch, 1936

In 1912, Hitler was reported to the police by an anonymous person on account of his unauthorized use of the title "academic painter," and warned not to use this title in the future. Probably the painter Karl Leidenroth, who also lived in the men’s dormitory and was Hanisch's friend, had reported Hitler at Hanisch's instigation.

On 5 August 1912, Hanisch left Vienna to return to Gablonz. From 1914 to 1917, he was a soldier in the First World War. On 4 July 1918, he came back to Vienna with his fiancée Franziska Bisurek; they married on 22 July 1918 and lived in Rauschergasse 19, XX District. The house belonged to the parents of a railroad conductor, Franz Feiler, a picture-collector, for whom Hanisch obtained various pictures.

On 20 July 1923, Hanisch was sentenced by the district court in Vienna to three months' imprisonment for theft. Hanisch was divorced on 17 April 1928. After 1930, Hanisch worked as a painter. He produced watercolors, which he sold as alleged works of Hitler from their years in Vienna. Hanisch often painted pictures of flowers in the style of the painter Olga Wisinger-Florian, which he sold as Hitler originals. To cover up the fraud, he had his friend Karl Leidenroth authenticate the forgeries. Nevertheless, on 7 May 1932, Hanisch was sentenced to three days in jail.

With Hitler's appointment as Chancellor in the spring of 1933, Hanisch became an object of interest. The Bavarian journalist and anti-Nazi Konrad Heiden, who was writing the first authoritative biography of Hitler, turned to Hanisch, then the only known witness of Hitler's Vienna period. Hanisch readily supplied information and was paid well. In the following years Hanisch made money from numerous interviews with national and international newspapers. Hanisch's memoir of Hitler posthumously appeared in 1939 in The New Republic.

Although Franz Feiler, the son of Hanisch's former landlord, was friendly with Hanisch, Feiler had acted since 1933 as a Viennese emissary of Hitler, on whose behalf he bought genuine and fake Hitler pictures in Vienna, and brought them to Germany. There they were either destroyed or transferred to the archives of the Nazi Party in Munich. In Easter 1933, in Berchtesgaden, Feiler gave Hitler some of Hanisch's "Hitler pictures". Hitler recognized these as forgeries, and instructed Feiler to file a complaint for fraud against Hanisch. Feiler followed Hitler's instructions, and on 6 July 1933, accused Hanisch of fraud. After spending several months in prison, Hanisch continued to forge Hitler's pictures.

On 16 November 1936, Hanisch was arrested. During a search of his rented room, the police found, in addition to manuscripts about Hitler, more Hitler fakes. On 2 December 1936, the Vienna regional court sentenced Hanisch to prison for fraud. Hanisch probably died in February 1937 in detention. Hanisch fakes occupied Hitler's staff for years after Hanisch's death. On 21 October 1942, Hitler ordered Heinrich Himmler to destroy three fake Hitler pictures, as well as other documents.

== Hanisch's statements about Hitler ==
Hanisch said Hitler had a marked disinclination to work. In particular, Hanisch disputed Hitler's assertion in Mein Kampf that Hitler had earned his living in Vienna for a time as a worker: "I've never seen him do hard work, yet I heard that he had labored as a construction worker. Contractors employ only strong and powerful people." Hanisch maintained that in windy speeches Hitler had repeatedly opposed the Social Democratic Party and, unlike the other residents of the men's home, always came down on the side of the state.

Hanisch also stressed that Hitler had a good relationship with the Jews in the men's home. According to this account, Hitler associated almost exclusively with Jews, and his best friend in the home was the Jewish copper cleaner Josef Neumann. Another Jewish friend was a one-eyed locksmith's assistant, Simon Robinsohn, who came from the town of Lisko in Galicia. The truth of these statements has been verified by historians.

According to Hanisch, Hitler pursued money-making schemes with another Meldemannstrasse dormitory resident, Josef Greiner; on one occasion, the two tried to collect excess paste and sell it as homemade antifreeze – but only in summer, so their fraud would not be discovered.

In the book The Mind of Adolf Hitler, Hanisch reports: "He (Hitler) was never an ardent worker, was unable to get up in the morning, had difficulty in getting started, and seemed to be suffering from a paralysis of the will."

== Death ==
According to the records of the Viennese authorities, Hanisch died of a heart attack, on 2 February 1937, after two months' incarceration in Vienna. Hitler's biographer Joachim Fest claims Hitler had Hanisch murdered.
