= Josef Greiner =

Austrian writer who claimed to have known the young Adolf Hitler in Vienna

Josef Greiner (28 June 1886 in Preding, Styria — 4 September 1971 in Vienna) was an Austrian writer. He supposedly knew Adolf Hitler during Hitler's time in Vienna and later published two memoirs on this topic, for which he is best known.

== Life and career ==
Josef Greiner was born in the Austrian state of Styria in 1886. He moved to Vienna around 1908 and earned his living through various jobs, including as a sign painter and as a lamplighter for a cabaret.

He lived in the Meldemannstraße dormitory from January to April 1910. It was during this period that he claimed to have first become acquainted with Adolf Hitler, who moved into the dormitory in February 1910 and stayed until 1913. According to an essay by Reinhold Hanisch published posthumously in The New Republic in 1939, during this period, Greiner and Hitler at one point worked together in a job that involved filling old tin cans with paint and then going door to door to sell it.

In 1938, Greiner published a memoir entitled Sein Kampf und Sieg. Eine Erinnerung an Adolf Hitler (His Struggle and Victory: A Memoir of Adolf Hitler). In it, he told of knowing Hitler during his time in the Meldemannstraße dormitory. He praised Hitler, calling him "Lord of Ostmark", a "genius", and a "messiah". Greiner sent copies of this book to Hitler, Benito Mussolini, Joseph Goebbels, and Hermann Göring, saying that the book could be mass-distributed and used as part of Nazi propaganda.

Greiner hoped that this would make him rich. He also touted himself as a successful businessman who would be an ideal choice to head the Reich Economics Ministry. Instead, Hitler ordered the publisher to pulp the book. In the Nazi Party files of the time, Greiner is referred to as an "extortionist". Greiner's repeated attempts to join the Nazi Party, beginning in May 1938, were rejected.

After World War II and the downfall of the Nazi regime, Greiner took advantage of his rejection by the Nazis to portray himself as a resistance fighter. In 1947, he published Das Ende des Hitler-Mythos (The End of the Hitler Myth). Greiner sent a copy of this book to Joseph Stalin, offering his services to facilitate Soviet-German economic relations.

== Greiner's claims ==
The End of the Hitler Myth contains several demonstrable errors about Hitler's life. For example, Greiner places Hitler in Vienna in 1907-1908, at which time Hitler was still living in Linz. He tells several stories about Hitler's anti-Semitic behaviour at this time, including a story that he tormented one Polish Jew with stink bugs and by giving children "Aryan chocolate" to induce them to torment their Jewish playmate as a "filthy Jew".

Greiner claims that at one point Hitler attempted to rape one of his models, although Hitler in fact never painted people during his time in Vienna. He claimed that Hitler contracted syphilis from a Leopoldstadt prostitute. He claimed that in 1945, Hitler did not commit suicide, but instead fled from Berlin in an aeroplane.

Greiner's claims to have been a heroic leader of the Austrian resistance also appear implausible.

=== Evaluation ===
In 1956, Franz Jetzinger, author of the book Hitler's Youth, dismissed Greiner's claims as "palpable lies".

Historian Robert G. L. Waite concluded in his 1977 book The Psychopathic God: Adolf Hitler that Greiner "in all probability never knew Hitler", and provides as evidence numerous devastatingly wrong factual errors in Greiner's accounts. He speculates that one of the reasons that so many historians accepted Greiner's work as legitimate is because Konrad Heiden, "an early and valued authority on Hitler," mentioned that among the people Hitler knew in Vienna was a "man by the name of Greiner." Waite believes that Josef Greiner used Heiden's statement as a way to insert himself into Hitler's life and capitalize on it to his own advantage.
