= Augustin Kubizek =

Austrian conductor and composer (1918–2009)

Augustin Kubizek (15 October 1918 – 24 March 2009) was an Austrian choir conductor and composer. He was the oldest son of August Kubizek, who was a childhood friend of Adolf Hitler.

== Works, editions and recordings ==
- Gaudia matris – on collection Jakobs Stern ist aufgegangen CD Carus Verlag
