= Julius Zerfaß =

Julius Zerfaß (Kirn, 4 February 1886 - Zürich, 24 March 1956) was a German journalist of the anti-Hitler "Poison Kitchen" group of the 1920s. Zerfaß, son of a small farmer and factory worker, worked as a gardener and later went hiking. Zerfaß made contact with the trade unions and the labor movement early on. From 1913 he worked as a freelance editor and as an editor of the social democratic press in Munich, among other things as a feature editor of the Munich Post. He was interned at Dachau Concentration Camp but on release escaped to Switzerland, where he published Eine Chronik (1936), one of the first accounts of the camp, under the pseudonym Walter Hornung.

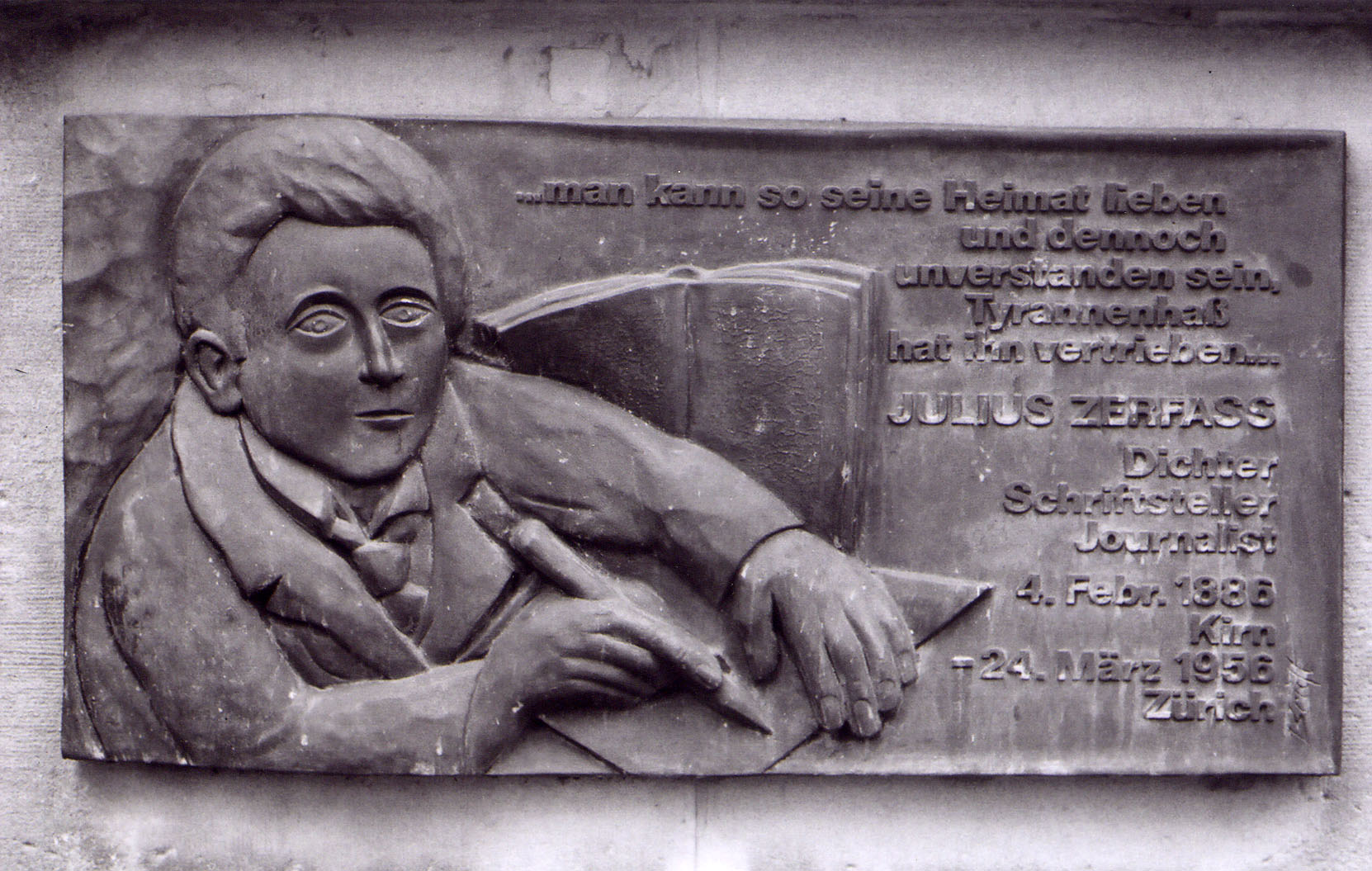
On Kirn's great bridge is a dedicated plate to him

== Books ==
Du Mensch in dieser Zeit .... Oprecht, Zürich 1946. (The men in this time....)
