= The Shakespeare Wars =

2006 book by Ron Rosenbaum

The Shakespeare Wars: Clashing Scholars, Public Fiascos, Palace Coups
- Author: Ron Rosenbaum
- Language: English
- Genre: Non-fiction
- Publication date: 2006

The Shakespeare Wars: Clashing Scholars, Public Fiascos, Palace Coups is a 2006 book by Ron Rosenbaum.

Rosenbaum's account of the genesis of this book is that it arose out of his need to cure the depression into which he fell in the wake of the research and writing he did for Explaining Hitler: The Search for the Origins of His Evil. That book related his search among contemporary historians for an adequate explanation for Hitler's evil—and the underlying tension between "exceptionalist" explanations (Hitler was off the grid of 'normal' human behavior) versus naturalist explanations (Hitler was at the end of, but within, a continuum of human behaviors).

The work left Rosenbaum so drained and gloomy that the only antidote he could find was "to start walking around the city [New York] listening to Shakespeare tapes on a Walkman."

When the cure became his next big project, he adopted a parallel approach, focusing on the tension between exceptionalist and naturalist accounts of Shakespeare's creativity.

His own inclination is, in the matter of Shakespeare, exceptionalist. One has to invoke, he writes, "the boundary between physics and metaphysics in trying the characterize this strange experience of deepening into bottomlessness" with each new reading or performance.
