= The Hidden Hitler =

2001 book by Lothar Machtan

- Cover of the first edition
- Author: Lothar Machtan
- Original title: Hitlers Geheimnis: Das Doppelleben Eines Diktators
- Translator: John Brownjohn
- Language: German
- Subject: Sexuality of Adolf Hitler
- Publisher: Basic Books
- Publication date: 2001
- English publication date: 2001
- Media type: Print (Hardcover)
- Pages: 434 pp
- ISBN: 0-465-04308-9
- Dewey Decimal: 943.086/092 B
- LC Class: DD247.H5 M235 2001

The Hidden Hitler (German: Hitlers Geheimnis. Das Doppelleben eines Diktators; literally "Hitler's Secret: The Double Life of a Dictator") is a 2001 book by German professor and historian Lothar Machtan. The German original was published by Alexander Fest Verlag, while the English-translated version was published by Basic Books in New York City.

The book discusses Adolf Hitler's sexuality. Machtan argues that Hitler was a closeted homosexual. Among the evidence, he cites the allegedly homoerotic nature of his friendship with August Kubizek during Hitler's youth in Vienna. The book was not well received by historians, who dispute Machtan's conclusion that Hitler was homosexual.

== Reviews ==
The book was reviewed in The New York Times Book Review by Walter Reich, a psychiatrist and former director of the United States Holocaust Memorial Museum. Reich wrotes "[T]he biggest problem with Machtan's book ... isn't the reliability of his sources but his mode of argumentation. He accepts what fits his thesis and rejects what doesn't. One feels, at times, that one is reading an internal F.B.I. report from the J. Edgar Hoover era rather than an evenhanded work of scholarship in which the author is ready to be led by the facts. To interpret evidence his way, Machtan employs innuendo and insinuation ..." Reich concedes that "though Machtan doesn't succeed in proving that Hitler was an active homosexual, he does demonstrate that his life, in both the personal and the political spheres, was suffused with homosexual themes and personalities. In some odd way, this may actually serve to humanize Hitler. But it doesn't serve to explain him."

== See also ==
- The Pink Swastika
- List of books by or about Adolf Hitler
- The Saturday Night Live character "Gay Hitler" possibly based on Machtan's book at Saturday Night Live characters appearing on Weekend Update
- Discussion of Springtime for Hitler in the 1968 film The Producers
- National Socialist League, also known as the Gay Nazi Party
- Psychopathography of Adolf Hitler
