= Johanna Hamann =

Peruvian artist (1954–2017)

Johanna Hamann Mazuré
- Born: Johanna Hamann Mazuré; July 21, 1954; Lima, Peru
- Died: April 7, 2017 (aged 62); Lima, Peru
- Education: BFA (sculpture), Pontifical Catholic University of Peru; M.A. in Humanities, Pontifical Catholic University of Peru; PhD in Public Space and Urban Regeneration, University of Barcelona (2011)
- Known for: Sculpture; exploration and representation of the human body
- Notable work: "Barrigas" (1978–1983); El Cuerpo Blasonado (series, 1994–1997) — including Cuerpo I (Opresión), Cuerpo II (Libertad), Cuerpo III (Ejecución)
- Style: Contemporary sculpture; conceptual body art
- Movement: Contemporary art
- Awards: Teacher Appreciation Award (PUCP, 2009); DAI Research Prize (PUCP, 2008); Recognition for Research (PUCP, 2012)

Johanna Hamann Mazuré (Lima, Peru. July 21, 1954-April 7, 2017) was a Peruvian sculptor. She emerged as a contemporary artist in the early 1980s and she is known for her sculptures that explore and represent the human body through unconventional perspectives.

She became a professor at Pontifical Catholic University of Peru in 1984. Later, she became the director of studies of PCUP's Department of Art and Design and researcher of the public art of Lima.

== Education ==
Hamann studied at the Pontifical Catholic University of Peru (PCUP) where she received a Bachelor of Fine Arts with a mention in sculpture.

She continued her education at PCUP and received a master's degree in Humanities.

In 2011, she received her Phd in Public Space and Urban Regeneration from the University of Barcelona. Her doctoral dissertation, Monumentos Públicos y Espacios Urbanos. Lima, 1919-1930, focused on the public art in Lima and its effect on the processes of the city's development and construction.

== Artworks ==
“Barrigas”, (1978-1983). Metal structure, plaste, resin. A sculpture of three hanging "wombs" from meat hooks. This sculpture was created in sharp contrast from the stereotype of pregnancy. Created during Peru's transition from an authoritarian dictatorship to democratic rule, her purpose of this piece was to address the violence women faced in Peru while exhibiting the harmful social expectations of motherhood

=== "El Cuerpo Blasonado" (1997). ===
A series of life size self portraits created to depict and reflect on life, pain, and death.

- "Cuerpo I (Opresión)", (1994-1997). Wax. A life size wax sculpture of a nude woman. The figure's hands are held behind her back and her head is tilted to look up.
- "Cuerpo II (Libertad)", (1994-1997). Olive tree. This sculpture is created out of olive tree to resemble a human figure. The human arms and torso stretch into wood carved moth wings.
- "Cuerpo III (Ejecución)", (1994-1997). Wax, steel. A wax sculpture of a woman with long hair seated holding a stainless steel guillotine that cuts her thighs. The metal sheet that resembles the guillotine's blade allows viewers to faintly see their own reflection.

== Exhibitions ==
- "Antológica", ICPNA Miraflores: March 1-April 10, 2016
- "Radical Women: Latin American Art", 1960–1985, Hammer Museum, Los Angeles: September 15-December 31, 2017
- "Radical Women: Latin American Art", 1960–1985, Brooklyn Museum, New York: April 13-July 22, 2018
- "Cuerpo, frágil refugio", Sala Luis Miró Quesada Garland, Municipalidad de Miraflores, Lima, Perú: 2002-2003
- "El Cuerpo Blasonado Esculturas", Centro Cultural de la Municipalidad de Miraflores, Lima, Perú: 1997
- "Muestra Antológica 1983/1991", Bienal Iberoamericana de Lima Casa de Nicolás Ribera El Viejo, Municipalidad Metropolitana de Lima, Perú: 1997
- "Johanna Hamann Esculturas y Dibujos", Centro Cultural de la Municipalidad de Miraflores, Lima, Perú: 1991
- "Johanna Hamann Obra Gráfica Reciente", Galería Trilce, Lima, Perú: 1988
- "Johanna Hamann Esculturas y Dibujos", Galería Camino Brent, Lima, Perú: 1985
- "Johanna Hamann Esculturas", Galería Forum, Lima, Perú: 1983

== Honors and awards ==
- Teacher Appreciation Award, PUCP. 2009
- Recognition for Research, PUCP. 2012
- DAI Research Prize, PUCP. 2008

== Publications ==
- Hamann Mazure, Johanna (21 January 2011). Monumentos públicos y espacios urbanos. Lima, 1919-1930 (Thesis). Universitat de Barcelona. hdl:10803/1552. ISBN 978-84-694-1767-6.
- Mazuré, Johanna Hamann (2011). "El nacimiento de lima: La imposición de un nuevo orden". On the W@terfront: 23–37.
- Lima: Espacio Público, Arte y Ciudad. 2013
- El cuerpo, un familiar desconocido. 2013
- El arte en el espacio público: interdisciplinariedad y convergencia. 2015
- Leguía, el Centenario y sus monumentos. Lima: 1919-1930. 2015
