= Sibylle Hamann =

Austrian politician (born 1966)

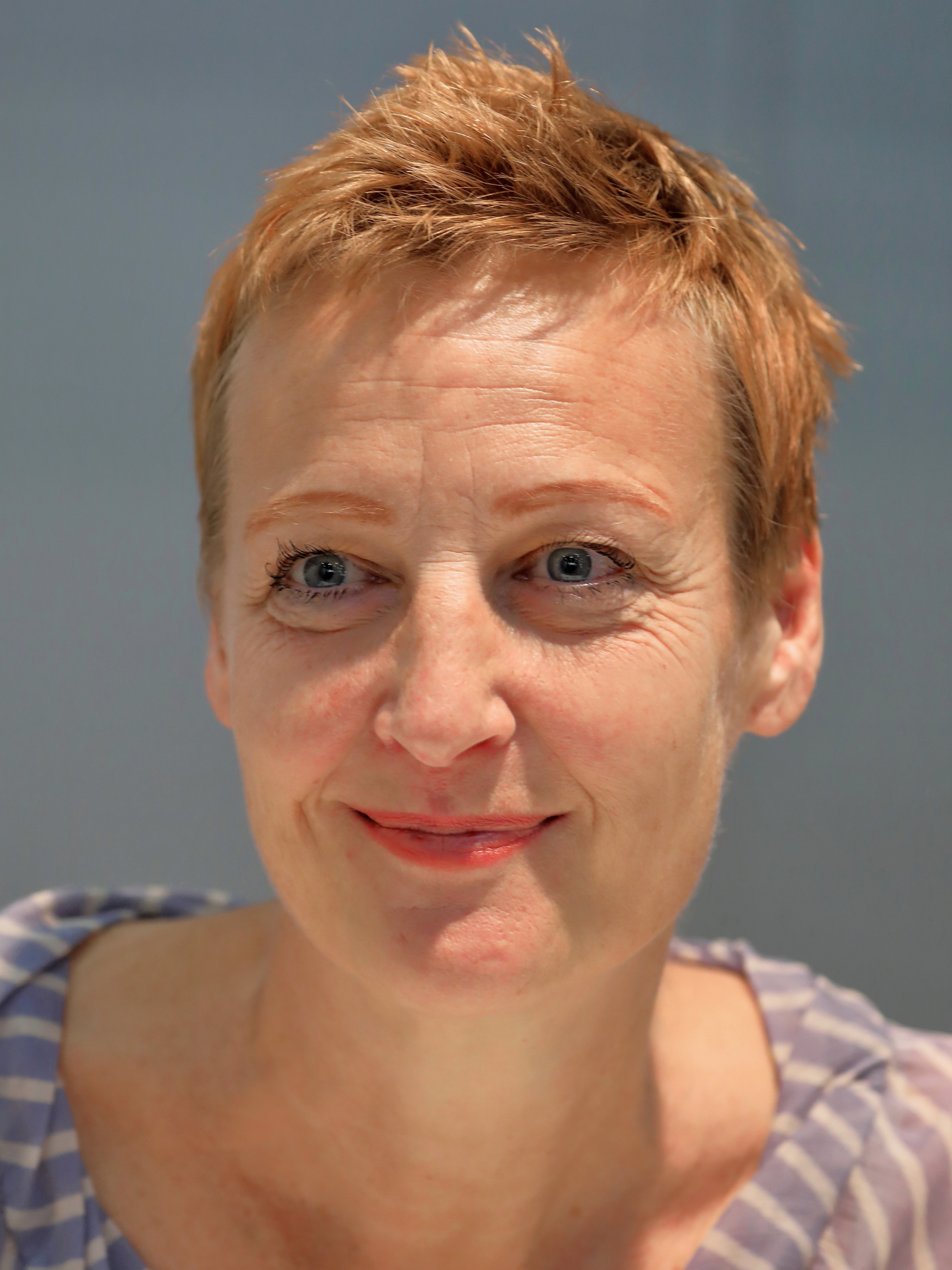
Sibylle Hamann at the 2019 Vienna Book Fair

Sibylle Hamann (born August 14, 1966, in Vienna) is a former Austrian journalist and politician (Die Grünen), now working as a school teacher. She was a member of the Austrian National Council from 2019 to 2024.

== Life ==
She grew up in Vienna, where she also completed her school education. Her parents are the historian Günther Hamann (1924–1994) and his wife Brigitte Hamann (1940–2016), a well-known author and historian. In 1984, she began studying political science in combination with history, ethnology, Russian at the University of Vienna and the Free University of Berlin, which she completed in 1989 with a research stay at the Beida University in Beijing, with a diploma thesis on Women's work and economic reforms in the People's Republic of China.

She then began working as a journalist for the daily newspaper Kurier, where she reported on the upheavals in the Soviet Union, the Caucasus and the Middle East, the end of apartheid in South Africa and the civil war in Rwanda in the "Foreign Policy" section from 1990 to 1994. In 1995, she moved to the news magazine Profil as an editor, where she wrote background reports on Africa, in particular the civil wars in Rwanda and the Democratic Republic of Congo (then Zaire). From 1999 to 2001, she was a freelance correspondent in New York City, from where she traveled extensively throughout the US and the Caribbean countries and reported on them. In 2001, she returned to Vienna for Profil and reported for the magazine on the Afghanistan war of the USA against the Taliban, which had broken out at the time. In 2004, she went back to New York for a year as a correspondent. She has lived in Vienna again since 2006 and writes a regular column as a freelance journalist in the bourgeois-liberal daily newspaper Die Presse, for the Viennese weekly newspaper Falter, as well as guest articles for the German feminist magazine Emma and for the weekly newspaper Die Zeit. In 2006/07 she worked as a lecturer at the Institute for Journalism Studies at the University of Vienna, as holder of the Theodor Herzl lectureship, then as a lecturer on the journalism course at the FHWien. She is best known to television audiences as a studio guest on ORF discussion programs. At the Burgtheater she participated as a moderator in the project Die letzten Zeugen (engl. The Last Witnesses) by Doron Rabinovici and Matthias Hartmann, which was shown from 2013 to 2015.

Hamann lives in Vienna and is the mother of two children.

At the federal congress of the Greens on July 6, 2019, she was elected to third place on the federal list (behind Werner Kogler and Leonore Gewessler). In the National Council election on September 29, 2019, she received 2098 preferential votes.

Sibylle Hamann was a member of the National Council Club of the Greens and her party's spokesperson for education. She served as the secretary of the parliamentary education committee and as member of the culture committee, the science committee and the social affairs committee.

The nationwide "100 Schools – 1000 Opportunities" program can be traced back to her initiative as an education politician. This enables 100 primary and secondary schools with particularly difficult conditions to break new ground in school development. The locations can try out new educational concepts and receive additional resources to do so. The project is being scientifically supported by a research group from the University of Vienna.

Hamann's tenure as parliamentarian lasted 5 years, ending on October 23, 2024. She now teaches at a middle school in Vienna.
