= Baroness Sigrid von Laffert =

Baroness Sigrid von Laffert (18 January 1916 – 8 September 2002) was a German socialite, member of the patrician Von Laffert family. She accompanied Adolf Hitler to the German Opera House in Berlin, Germany in December 1935. She was rumored to be a romantic companion of Hitler during the time he neglected his companion Eva Braun, between early March and late May 1935. Von Laffert was also a relative of Viktoria von Dirksen, the widow of Willibald von Dirksen, secret legations counsel for Kaiser Wilhelm.

Von Laffert was a member of the Alliance of German Maidens (Bund Deutscher Mädel, or BDM) during the year 1932-1933. This was the girls' branch of the Hitler Youth. A blonde woman, she was considered among the most beautiful women around Hitler. She was invited by him to various festive events. Among these was a National Day of Celebration of the German People, held on May 1, 1934. The occasion was staged as a large propaganda public display at Tempelhof Field.

Von Laffert continued to appear at important Nazi government functions as late as March 1939. In 1939 she was invited to a state dinner in the Chancellor's home. It is plausible that Eva Braun was forbidden to appear on such occasions. In 1940 she married count Johannes von Welczek (1911-1969), a german diplomat. She died in September 2002 at the age of 86.
