= Maria Reiter =

Adolf Hitler's love interest (1911–1992)

- Born: 23 December 1911; Berchtesgaden, German Empire
- Died: 28 July 1992 (aged 80); Munich, Germany
- Other names: Mimi, Mitzi
- Occupation: Shop worker
- Known for: Associated romantically with Adolf Hitler in the late 1920s
- Spouse(s): Ferdinand Woldrich (m. 1930 div. 1933); Georg Kubisch (1936–1940)
- Parent(s): Karl Reiter; Mara Reiter

Maria Josepha Reiter (23 December 1911 – 28 July 1992), known as "Mimi" or "Mitzi", was associated romantically with Adolf Hitler in the late 1920s. She told her story to the German periodical Stern in 1959.

== Early life ==
Reiter was the daughter of an official of the Social Democratic Party in Berchtesgaden.

== Relationship with Adolf Hitler ==
Hitler met Reiter when she was working in a shop in Obersalzberg, one of Hitler's favourite retreats. According to Reiter's own account, the 37-year-old Hitler became friendly with the 16-year-old girl, grooming her before he asked her out. At the end of the evening, he made a "coarse" sexual advance toward her, which she rejected, but he did coerce her into kissing. They had a number of other dates during which Hitler was increasingly emotionally manipulative. According to the Stern article, Hitler "told her that he wanted her to be his wife, to found a family with her, to have blonde children, but at the moment he had not the time to think of such things. Repeatedly Hitler spoke of his duty, his mission." He told her to wait for him and that they would live together. After this declaration, Hitler ignored her and broke up the liaison. This plunged her into depression. In 1928 while in despair, she attempted to hang herself, but her brother-in-law found her and saved her life.

After this episode, Reiter gave up on Hitler and married local hotelkeeper Ferdinand Woldrich. The marriage was not a success and in 1931 Reiter left her husband. After a visit from Rudolf Hess convinced her of Hitler's continuing interest in her, she travelled to Munich to see Hitler once more. Reiter stated that she spent the night with Hitler and that "I let everything happen. I had never been so happy as I was that night". Hitler suggested that she remain in Munich as his lover, but Reiter wanted marriage. Hitler was concerned that a relationship with a woman who had left her husband would be politically damaging to him, so the couple parted. Nevertheless, Hitler directed his personal lawyer Hans Frank to handle her divorce.

In 1934, after Hitler's rise to power, Reiter met him once more and he again asked her to become his lover. Again she refused. This led to an argument in which Hitler reiterated that he could not marry or have children because he had a "big mission" to fulfill. Eventually, she married SS-Hauptsturmführer Georg Kubisch in 1936. Hitler congratulated Kubisch on his marriage at an assembly of the SS in Munich. Their last meeting was in 1938, when, according to Reiter, Hitler expressed dissatisfaction with his relationship with Eva Braun. Kubisch was killed in 1940 during the Battle of Dunkirk, after which Hitler sent Reiter 100 red roses.

The details of Reiter's story about their physical relationship cannot be confirmed, though the fact that Hitler was in love with her was asserted by his sister Paula, who stated that she was the only woman who might have curbed his destructive impulses. Further, two letters dating from April 1945 by Reiter to Hitler were found after the war. They were "written in affectionate terms" and suggest intimacy by the words used.
