= Franz Jetzinger =

Austrian politician (1882–1965)

Franz Jetzinger (3 December 1882 in Ranshofen in Upper Austria – 19 March 1965 in Ottensheim in Upper Austria) was an Austrian clergyman, academic, politician, civil servant, editor and author. He remains especially famous as author of the book Hitler’s Youth.

== Life and work ==
After graduating from school, Jetzinger studied at the theological faculty of the university of Salzburg. He became a Jesuit priest and professor at the philosophic-theological academy in Linz. In this capacity he visited, amongst other places, Palestine in 1908.

During the First World War, Jetzinger served as a military chaplain. In 1918 he began an intensive political career: first in the German People's Party (electoral district Ried) and from 1919 on in the Sozialdemokratische Arbeiterpartei (Social Democratic Worker Party). On 14 February 1921 the Catholic Church excommunicated him. From 1919 until 1934, Jetzinger served as social democratic assemblyman in the federal state Diet (electoral district Innviertel). From 1920 until 1930 he was editor at Tagesblatt. After he had worked as deputy for two years, Jetzinger became District Administrator in 1932 and therefore member of the Upper Austrian federal state government in Linz.

After the ban to take mandates on 12 February 1934, Jetzinger, being a social democrat, was arrested by Dollfuß for five weeks. Afterwards he worked as insurance appointee for the Viennese local government. In 1935 he re-entered the Catholic Church and worked as librarian in the student's library in Linz.

Having been a member of the federal state government, Jetzinger had secured for himself the Austrian military file of Adolf Hitler, which included details on Hitler's arrest in 1914, which took place because he fled from military conscription. After Hitler had annexed Austria in 1938, he repeatedly tried to have the Gestapo locate and secure the compromising file, but Jetzinger successfully hid it in his attic until 1945, despite his arrest by the Gestapo on 22 April 1944. In 1956, Jetzinger, who hated Hitler and the National Socialist regime, wrote the book Hitler's Jugend (Hitler’s Youth), in which he also published the contents of Hitler's military file.

== Hitler’s Youth ==
Jetzinger gained fame in 1958 through the English version of his book Hitler’s Youth, in which he could refute many of Hitler's statements about his early years. He attracted attention by attacking an earlier published book The Young Hitler I Knew by August Kubizek, whom Jetzinger accused of spreading falsehoods. While earlier Hitler biographers like Joachim Fest or Werner Maser adopted Jetzinger's criticism as their own, Jetzinger's crushing judgment of Kubizek's credibility has been challenged by Brigitte Hamann, author of Hitlers Wien. In 2006, Ian Kershaw opined that "Jetzinger's scholarship is, in fact, not invariably superior to Kubizek's vivid pen-picture of the young Hitler, and contains some weaknesses of its own, both factual and interpretative."

Still, Jetzinger's work remains relevant in the 21st century: In 2007, BBC Radio 4 broadcast a radio play titled Dr Freud Will See You Now, Mr[s] Hitler, a largely counter-factual work written by a pair of established Jewish screenwriters who credit Hitler's Youth for the factual basis which launched their enterprise a decade earlier. In September 2025 it premiered as a stage play at Upstairs at the Gatehouse in London.

== Work ==
- Hitler's Jugend (in German). Wien: Europa-Verl. 1956.
  - Hitler's Youth. Trans. Lawrence Wilson. London: Hutchinson. 1958.
