= Brigitte Hamann =

Austrian-German historian

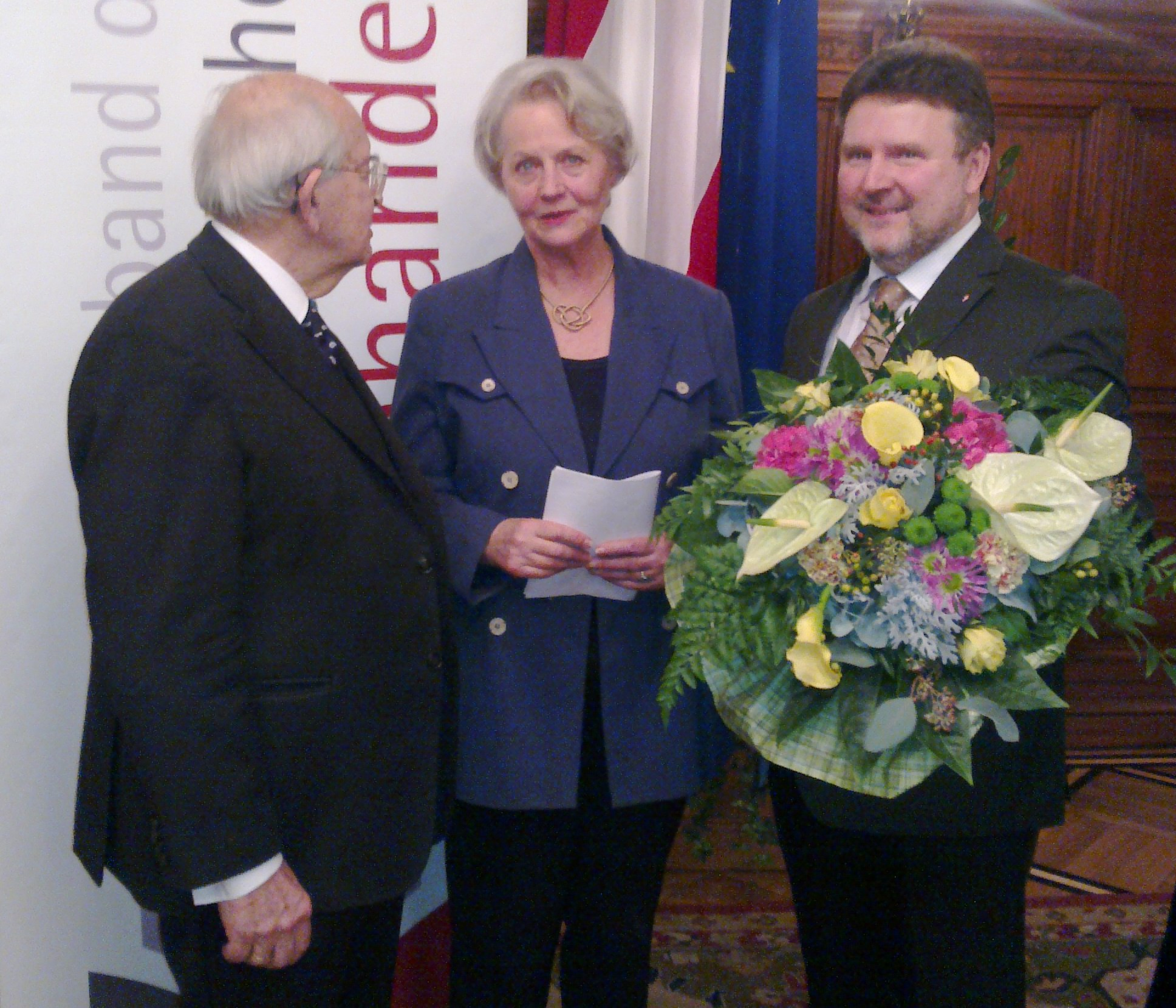
- Presentation of the Honorary Prize of the Austrian Booksellers to Brigitte Hamann in the Vienna City Hall on 22 November 2012. To the left: the eulogist, Gerald Stourzh, to the right city councilor Michael Ludwig
- Born: Brigitte Deitert; July 26, 1940; Essen, Germany
- Died: October 4, 2016 (aged 76); Vienna, Austria
- Occupations: author and historian

Brigitte Hamann (née Deitert; 26 July 1940 – 4 October 2016) was a German-Austrian author and historian based in Vienna.

== Biography ==
Born in Essen, Germany, Hamann studied history in Münster and Vienna. She worked as a journalist in Essen for some time. In 1965, she married historian Günther Hamann (1924–1994), moved to Vienna and obtained Austrian citizenship in addition to her German. The couple had three children; one of them is journalist and feminist Sibylle Hamann. Brigitte Hamann worked with her husband at the University of Vienna and in 1978 obtained a doctor's degree on the basis of a thesis on the life of Crown Prince Rudolf of Austria. The thesis was published as a book the same year. She described her working method as follows: "(Coming from Germany) I had a different view of Austria, and I began to write with a certain detachment".

The success of her first book led to further books, notably on Empress Elisabeth of Austria, Adolf Hitler, and Winifred Wagner.

Hamann's 1996 book Hitler's Vienna: A Dictator's Apprenticeship examined how societal attitudes at the time shaped Hitler's anti-Semitic views during his time in Vienna between 1908 and 1913, and the effects of his inordinate fear of both infection and women. Following the publication of The Hidden Hitler by historian and University of Bremen professor Lothar Machtan, Hamann investigated claims about Hitler's homosexuality and appears in the 2004 HBO documentary film, Hidden Fuhrer: Debating the Enigma of Hitler's Sexuality, by American documentarians Fenton Bailey and Randy Barbato.

In 2005, Hamann released Winifred Wagner: A Life at the Heart of Hitler's Bayreuth, a biography of Winifred Wagner, the British-born woman who became a founding member of the Nazi Party and a close friend of Hitler. The publication earned her "Book of the Year" honours by Opernwelt ('opera world') magazine and "Historical Book of the Year" honours from Damals ('at that time') history magazine. That same year she received the Press Club Concordia "Concordia Prize" in recognition of her work.

Hamann died on 4 October 2016 in Vienna at the age of 76.

== Honors ==
- Heinrich Drimmel Preis (1978)
- Premio Comisso (1982)
- Donauland Sachbuchpreis (1986)
- Anton Wildgans Prize (1994)
- Kreisky Preis (1997)
- Friedrich-Schiedel-Literaturpreis (1998)
- Prize of the City of Vienna for Journalism (2004)
- Ehrenmedaille der Bundeshauptstadt Wien in Silber (2006)
- Honorary prize of the Austrian Booksellers for tolerance in thought and deed (2012)

== Books translated into English ==
- The Reluctant Empress: A Biography of Empress Elisabeth of Austria (Knopf: 1986) (ISBN 0-394-53717-3)
- The Reluctant Empress, Ullstein Verlag, Berlin 1982, 6th ed. 2000
- Bertha von Suttner: A Life for Peace (Syracuse Studies on Peace and Conflict Resolution) (Syracuse University Press: 1986) ISBN 0-8156-0387-8
- Rudolf. The Road to Mayerling (German and English, picture book) München 1988
- Sissi, Elisabeth, Empress of Austria (Taschen America: 1997) (ISBN 3-8228-7865-0)
- Hitler's Vienna: A Dictator's Apprenticeship. (1999: Oxford University Press) ISBN 0-19-514053-2
- Winifred Wagner: A Life at the Heart of Hitler's Bayreuth. (2005: Granta publications, England) ISBN 1-86207-671-5
- Winifred Wagner: A Life at the Heart of Hitler's Bayreuth, Harcourt Books, Orlando USA 2006

An English translation of the rororo monograph Die Familie Wagner is to appear.

== Books in German ==
- Rudolf, Kronprinz und Rebell, Wien 1978
- Elisabeth, Kaiserin wider Willen, Wien 1981
- Mit Kaiser Max in Mexiko, Wien 1983
- Kaiserin Elisabeth. Das poetische Tagebuch, Verlag der Österr. Akademie der Wissenschaften, Wien 1984
- Bertha von Suttner. Ein Leben für den Frieden, München 1986
- Die Habsburger. Ein biographisches Lexikon, München 1988
- Nichts als Musik im Kopf. Das Leben von Wolfgang Amadeus Mozart, Wien 1990 (Kinderbuch)
- Elisabeth. Bilder einer Kaiserin, Wien 1995
- Meine liebe, gute Freundin! Die Briefe Kaiser Franz Josephs an Katharina Schratt, München 1992
- Hitlers Wien. Lehrjahre eines Diktators, München 1996
- Kronprinz Rudolf: 'Majestät, ich warne Sie...', München 2002
- Winifred Wagner oder Hitlers Bayreuth, München 2002
- Der erste Weltkrieg. Wahrheit und Lüge in Bildern und Texten, München 2004
- Ein Herz und viele Kronen. Das Leben der Kaiserin Maria Theresia. Illustriert von Rolf Rettich, Wien 2004 (Kinderbuch)
- Die Familie Wagner, Reinbek bei Hamburg 2005
- Kronprinz Rudolf. Ein Leben, Wien 2005
- Mozart. Sein Leben und seine Zeit, Wien 2006
- Hitlers Edeljude. Das Leben des Armenarztes Eduard Bloch, München 2008

Numerous editions, paperbacks, and translations
