= Milverine =

Local celebrity in Milwaukee, Wisconsin (born 1962)

- Born: John Frank Hamann; November 27, 1962 (age 63); Milwaukee, Wisconsin, U.S.
- Occupation: Construction worker
- Known for: Resemblance of Wolverine

John Frank Hamann (born November 27, 1962), better known as the Milverine, is an American man known for his resemblance of the comic book and film character Wolverine while walking shirtless in his hometown of Milwaukee, Wisconsin. The name Milverine is a portmanteau of "Milwaukee" and "Wolverine."

== Life ==
Hamann was born in Milwaukee. He grew up in Milwaukee's South Side and attended Pulaski High School. As of 2018, he is a part-time construction worker and former aspiring cage fighter. He is a fan of opera music.

Hamann began taking daily two-to-three-hour speed walks in Milwaukee around the early 2000s, going shirtless in weather above 60 °F (16 °C). He attracted notice for his muscles and hairy chest—making him resemble Wolverine portrayer Hugh Jackman of the X-Men film series—but was unaware of his celebrity until others made pages about him on social media. Around 2010, a Milwaukee resident who dubbed Hamann the "Milverine" started a Facebook page featuring photos of Hamann on his walks. Fan pages also appeared on Yelp, Twitter, and Tumblr, and by 2011 Hamann was described as a "Milwaukee legend".

Hamann has participated in local events and been the subject of songs, internet memes, and other media. He appeared at a meet-and-greet in December 2011 where Milverine T-shirts were sold for his benefit. The Milwaukee Film Festival featured him in a promotional video in 2013. In 2017, he disappeared from public view when his mother died and he tore his meniscus, but he returned to his routine after eight months of recovering from meniscus surgery.

In November 2018, the Walker's Point brewery MobCraft Beer produced a milk stout called "Moo-Waukee" emblazoned with Hamann's image. Vice Media released a nine-minute documentary about Hamann, "Wisconsin Legend 'Milverine' Has Never Left Milwaukee", in February 2020. The National Bobblehead Hall of Fame and Museum in Milwaukee made a bobblehead figurine of Hamann for Milwaukee Day on April 14, 2020.
