= Explaining Hitler =

1998 book by Ron Rosenbaum

Explaining Hitler: The Search for the Origins of His Evil
- Author: Ron Rosenbaum
- Language: English
- Subject: Adolf Hitler
- Published: 1998
- Media type: Print
- Pages: 520 (second edition)
- ISBN: 978-0306823183
- LC Class: DD247.H5

Explaining Hitler: The Search for the Origins of His Evil is a 1998 book by historian-journalist Ron Rosenbaum, in which the author discusses his struggles with the "exceptionalist" character of Adolf Hitler's personality and impact on the world or, worse, his struggle with the possibility that Hitler is not an exception at all, but on the natural continuum of human destructive possibility.

== See also ==
- Ron Rosenbaum Explaining Hitler Interview on C-SPAN
- List of Adolf Hitler books
- Münchener Post
