= Münchener Post =

German socialist newspaper (1888–1933)

- Type: Weekly
- Founded: 1888
- Ceased publication: 9 March 1933
- Political alignment: Social Democrat
- Language: German language
- Headquarters: Munich

The Münchener Post (Engl. Munich Post) was a socialist newspaper published in Munich, Germany, from 1888 to 1933. The paper was known for its decade-long campaign against Adolf Hitler and the Nazi Party before their accession to power. It was shut down by Hitler in March 1933 immediately after he became the Reich Chancellor.

== History ==
The newspaper had been founded by the Bavarian Social Democratic Party, and its initial opposition to Hitler was based on ideological grounds, but quickly acquired a personal dimension both for the journalists involved and for Hitler himself. The newspaper was highly critical of Hitler and the Nazi Party and ran a series of extremely negative investigative exposés about Hitler in the 1920s and early 1930s. In 1931, it broke the Röhm scandal, revealing the homosexuality of SA leader Ernst Röhm.

Adolf Hitler and the Nazi Party called the newspaper and its editors “Giftküche” (The Poison Kitchen) and “Münchener Pest” (“Munich Pestilence” or “Munich Plague”). Hitler considered the paper one of his most vexing public adversaries, and the paper was the target of libel actions by the Nazi Party. The Post wrote from a populist perspective, viewing Hitler and his party as a dangerous band of gangsters rather than as ideological enemies, or as a bona fide political movement at all.

In 1933, as part of the Nazi elimination of media opposition, they ordered the closure of certain news outlets across Germany. All Socialist newspapers’ buildings were taken over by the government. The newspaper’s offices were ransacked by the SA on 9 March 1933, ending publication of the Post, and the paper’s staff went into hiding. They were eventually arrested and put in Munich jails. The journalists were banned from practicing their profession, struggled to find other work and deprived of their pensions. Julius Zerfaß spent six months at the Dachau concentration camp.

== Operations ==
The Munich Post did not pretend to be a neutral newspaper. The paper was one of the few early warning voices regarding the dangers posed by the rise of the Nazi Party, although their warnings went largely unheeded at the time.

The editors in charge of the Münchener Post's coverage of Hitler and the Nazis were Editor in Chief Erhard Auer, Editor Martin Gruber, Political Editor Edmund Goldschagg and Features Editor Julius Zerfaß.

== Post-war importance to the Holocaust ==
In the 50th anniversary addition of the Rise and Fall of the Third Reich, Ron Rosenbaum discusses how the Post tried to expose the Nazi Party's plans of mass genocide and extermination of European Jews in the early 30s, to no avail.

It was the Post that discovered and published on December 9, 1931, a secret Nazi Party post-takeover plan for the Jews in which can be found the first known use of the Nazi party euphemism for genocide - "Endlösung," Final Solution.

— Ron Rosenbaum, The Rise and Fall of the Third Reich

== Works cited ==
- Silvia Bittencourt (2013). A Cozinha Venenosa - Um Jornal contra Hitler. São Paulo, Brazil: Editora Três Estrelas. ISBN 978-85-65339-15-5.
- Petty, Terrence (2019). Enemy of the people – the Munich Post and the journalists who opposed Hitler. Associated Press. ISBN 978-1-7338462-6-4. OCLC 1102668937.
