= Lothar Machtan =

German historian

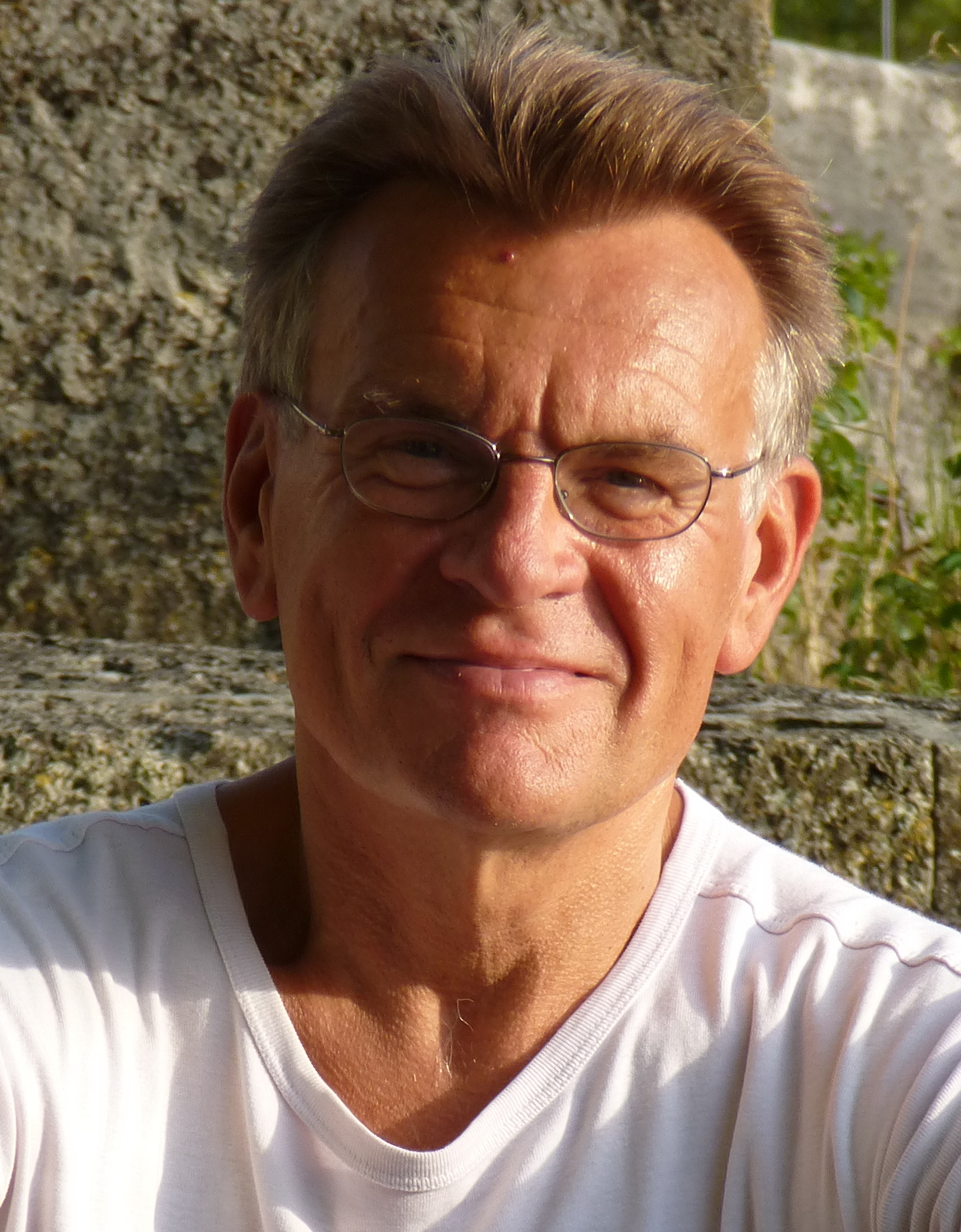
Lothar Machtan

Lothar Machtan (born 4 October 1949) is a German historian, writer, as well as professor of Modern and Current History at the University of Bremen.

== Early life ==
Born in Gelsenkirchen, Machtan studied history and political sciences at Heidelberg University from 1968 to 1974. 15 years later he became professor of modern history at the University of Bremen. Furthermore, he worked as a researcher in Konstanz, Berlin, Kassel, Halle and at the Claremont McKenna College in California. The main field of his historical work is the cultural history of politics.

== Career ==
For 30 years, Machtan has researched German history, politics, and socioeconomics. His writings have been featured in newspapers and magazines such as Der Spiegel as well as radio broadcasts.

He has been a guest lecturer at international conferences and symposia and a consultant for German TV programs such as Varzin – Warcino – Ein unbequemes Erbe (Warcino – An uncomfortable legacy, 1989). In the United States, he was a featured guest on NBC's The Today Show and The Early Show on CBS. The author of several books and numerous publications on the social and political history of the 19th and 20th centuries, in 1998 Machtan published Bismarcks Tod und Deutschlands Tränen (Bismarck's Death and Germany's Tears).

=== Hitler biography ===
In 2001, he published Hitlers Geheimnis: Das Doppelleben eines Diktators (Hitler's Secret: The double life of a dictator) with an English translation by John Brownjohn entitled The Hidden Hitler. In it, Machtan presents a documented study which he claims establishes Adolf Hitler's homosexuality and the impact of this upon his life and career. The book was not well received by historians, who dispute Machtan's conclusion that Hitler was homosexual.

In discussing his book in The Washington Post, Machtan told his interviewer that his research showed that some of Hitler's homosexual friends in Munich were the ones who opened many important doors for him, especially Ernst Röhm, Dietrich Eckart, and Ernst Hanfstaengl. (Note: While Machtan claims Eckart and Hanfstaengl were gay, it is not generally accepted that they were.) Machtan told the newspaper that "without their help, [Hitler] would not have had the support that he got from bourgeois circles and even from intellectuals and artists. In 2004, the documentary film Hidden Führer: Debating the Enigma of Hitler's Sexuality was made based on The Hidden Hitler. Aired by HBO's CINEMAX Reel Life, it follows Machtan as he travels around Germany to the places of Hitler's youth and explains his thesis and evidence.

Machtan's book, Der Kaisersohn bei Hitler (The Kaiser's son at Hitler's), was released in March 2006. His book Die Abdankung: Wie Deutschlands gekrönte Häupter aus der Geschichte fielen (The Abdication – How Germany's crowned heads fell out of history), was published in October 2008.

== Works ==
- Bismarcks Tod und Deutschlands Tränen. Reportage einer Tragödie. Goldmann, Munich 1998.
- Hitlers Geheimnis. Das Doppelleben eines Diktators. A. Fest Verlag, Berlin 2001 (expanded edition bei S. Fischer, Frankfurt 2003)
- Der Kaisersohn bei Hitler. Hoffmann & Campe, Hamburg 2006.
- Die Abdankung: Wie Deutschlands gekrönte Häupter aus der Geschichte fielen. Propyläen, Berlin 2008.
