= Geoffrey J. Giles =

Historian of Germany

Geoffrey J. Giles is a historian of Germany and professor emeritus at the University of Florida.

== Works ==
- Giles, Geoffrey J. (1985). Students and National Socialism in Germany. Princeton University Press. ISBN 978-0-691-05453-7.
