= August Kubizek =

Close friend of Adolf Hitler (1888–1956)

- August Kubizek in his youth
- Born: August Friedrich Kubizek; 3 August 1888; Linz, Austria-Hungary
- Died: 23 October 1956 (aged 68); Eferding, Austria
- Known for: Friend of Adolf Hitler
- Political party: Nazi Party (1940–1945)
- Military career
- Allegiance: Austria-Hungary
- Branch: Austro-Hungarian Army
- Service years: 1914–1918
- Conflicts: World War I

August Friedrich Kubizek (3 August 1888 – 23 October 1956) was an Austrian musical conductor and writer, best known for being a close friend of Adolf Hitler when both were in their late teens. He later wrote about their friendship in his book The Young Hitler I Knew (1955).

== Early life ==
August Kubizek was born in Linz, Austria, the only surviving child to parents of Czech and Sudeten-German origin. He was baptized Catholic at the St. Matthias Church where his parents had married the previous year. His father Michael Kubíček (also born in Linz) was an upholsterer while his mother Maria Panholzer-Bláhová, who was born illegitimate in Rosee, was 14.

His sisters Maria, Therese and Karoline died in early childhood. Kubizek later wrote that this was a striking parallel between his own life and that of Adolf Hitler, whose mother had lost four children prematurely. As the surviving sons of grief-stricken mothers, Kubizek and Hitler felt they had been spared or "chosen" by fate.

Kubizek and Hitler first met while competing for standing room in the Landestheater in Linz. Because of their shared passion for the operas of Richard Wagner, they quickly became close friends and later roommates in Vienna while both sought admission into college. The two shared a small room in Stumpergasse 31 in the sixth district of Vienna from 22 February to early July 1908.

As the only son of a self-employed upholsterer, Kubizek was expected to someday take over his father's business, but he secretly harboured dreams of becoming a conductor. With Hitler's encouragement, he devoted an increasing amount of his time to this passion, completing all of the musical training available to him in Linz. However, to achieve his goal of being an orchestral conductor, he would require higher education in music which was offered only in Vienna. It was an 18-year-old Hitler who persuaded Kubizek's father to let his son go to the metropolis to attend the conservatory. As Kubizek wrote, this was something that permanently changed the course of his life.

He was accepted into the Musikschule Kaiser. Hitler, however, was twice denied entrance into Vienna's art academy, a fact which he kept hidden from his friend for some time. The exam had a pass rate of around 15%, but Hitler took it very badly. In 1908, Hitler abruptly broke off the friendship and drifted into homelessness. Kubizek completed his studies in 1912 and was hired as conductor of the orchestra in Marburg on the Drau, Austria (Maribor, in Slovenia, after 1918). He was later offered a position at the Stadttheater in Klagenfurt. This job and his musical career were cut short by the beginning of World War I. Before leaving for the front, he married Anna Funke (7 October 1887 – 4 October 1976), a violinist from Vienna with whom he had three sons: Augustin, Karl Maria and Rudolf.

From August 1914 until November 1918, Kubizek served as a reservist in Regiment 2 of the Austro-Hungarian Infantry. In the Carpathian winter campaign of 1915, he was wounded at Eperjes in Hungary (now Prešov in Slovakia) and later evacuated to Budapest in an ambulance train. After months of convalescence, he returned to the front and was attached to a mechanised corps in Vienna. After the war, Kubizek accepted a position as an official in the municipal council of Eferding, Upper Austria and music became his hobby.

== Later contact with Hitler ==
After seeing Hitler on the front page of the Münchner Illustrierte, circa 1920, Kubizek followed his friend's career with some interest, although he did not attempt to contact him until 1933 when he wrote to congratulate him on having become Chancellor of Germany. On 4 August of that year, Kubizek received an unexpected reply from Hitler, who wrote to his old friend "Gustl" saying, "I should be very glad... to revive once more with you those memories of the best years of my life."

Thirty years after Hitler broke off contact with Kubizek, the two friends were reunited on 9 April 1938 during one of Hitler's visits to Linz. The two spoke for over an hour at the Hotel Weinzinger and Hitler offered Kubizek the conductorship of an orchestra, which Kubizek politely refused. Upon learning of his friend's three sons, Hitler insisted on financing their educations at the Anton Bruckner Conservatory in Linz. Hitler later invited Kubizek to attend the Bayreuth festival as his guest in 1939 and again in 1940.

Kubizek saw Hitler for the last time on 23 July 1940. As late as 1944, Hitler sent Kubizek's mother a food basket for her 80th birthday.

When the tide began to turn against Hitler, Kubizek, who had avoided politics all his life, became a member of the Nazi Party in 1942 as a gesture of loyalty to his friend. While the source of this date is his autobiography, the Bundesarchiv says that he became a member on 21 February 1940 and had the membership number 7.963.823.

== Later life, imprisonment and memoirs ==
In December 1945, Kubizek gathered the collection of keepsakes given to him by Hitler during their youth and concealed them carefully in the basement of his house in Eferding. He was arrested by American forces shortly afterwards and held at Glasenbach, where he was imprisoned and interrogated by the U.S. Army Criminal Investigation Command. His home was searched, but the Hitler correspondence and drawings were not found. He was released on 8 April 1947.

In 1951, Kubizek, who had rejected other post-war offers for his memoirs, agreed to publish Adolf Hitler, mein Jugendfreund ("Adolf Hitler, My Childhood Friend") through the Leopold Stocker Verlag. The original manuscript, written in 1943 at the behest of Martin Bormann (Kubizek says in his memoirs that Martin Bormann asked him to do so), had been only 150 pages long.

After communications answering questions from the Hitler biographer Franz Jetzinger, his new extended version had 352 pages and included several pictures, many of which showed postcards and sketches given to Kubizek by Hitler when young, between 1906 and 1908. The book is divided into three parts and consists of a prologue, 24 chapters and an epilogue.

It caused a stir when it was released in 1953, and was later translated into several languages. In the epilogue, Kubizek wrote, "Even though I, a fundamentally unpolitical individual, had always kept aloof from the political events of the period which ended forever in 1945, nevertheless no power on earth could compel me to deny my friendship with Adolf Hitler."

Kubizek's second wife and widow, Pauline (1906–2001), was credited with having provided the Stocker Verlag with additional photographs for the book's fourth edition in 1975.

He died on 23 October 1956, aged 68, in Linz and is buried in Eferding, Upper Austria.

== In popular culture ==
Kubizek is portrayed by Rupert Grint in "Adolf Hitler: The Artist", a 2017 episode of the British television series Urban Myths, in which Hitler calls him "Gustl".

== Works ==
- Kubizek, A. (1955). The Young Hitler I Knew: The Memoirs of Hitler's Childhood Friend ISBN 978-1848326071
- Adolf Hitler, mein Jugendfreund - August Kubizek (1953) & (2002) ISBN 3-7020-0971-X, ISBN 3-7020-0213-8, English translation: Young Hitler, the Story of Our Friendship (1955) & (1976)

== See also ==
- Reinhold Hanisch
- Josef Greiner
