= Ron Rosenbaum =

American journalist and critic (born 1946)

Ronald Rosenbaum (born November 27, 1946) is an American literary journalist, literary critic, and novelist.

== Early life and education ==
Rosenbaum was born into a Jewish family in New York City and grew up in Bay Shore, New York, on Long Island. He graduated from Yale University in 1968 and won a Carnegie Fellowship to attend Yale's graduate program in English Literature, though he dropped out after taking one course.

== Career ==
Rosenbaum began his career as an editor of The Fire Island News and then wrote for The Village Voice for several years, leaving in 1975 after which he wrote for Esquire, Harper's, High Times, Vanity Fair, New York Times Magazine, and Slate.

Rosenbaum spent more than ten years doing research on Adolf Hitler including travels to Vienna, Munich, London, Paris, and Jerusalem, interviewing leading historians, philosophers, biographers, theologians and psychologists. Some of those interviewed by Rosenbaum included Daniel Goldhagen, David Irving, Rudolph Binion, Claude Lanzmann, Hugh Trevor-Roper, Alan Bullock, Christopher Browning, George Steiner, and Yehuda Bauer. The result was his 1998 book, Explaining Hitler: The Search for the Origins of His Evil.

In Explaining Hitler, Ron Rosenbaum also recounted in detail the previously little-reported story of the efforts of anti-Hitler journalists at the Munich Post who, from 1920 to 1933, published repeated exposés on the criminal activities of the Nazis. Matthew Ricketson, coordinator of the Journalism program at RMIT University's School of Applied Communication in Melbourne, Australia, called this book "a brilliant piece of research".

In 1987, he began writing a weekly column for the New York Observer called "The Edgy Enthusiast". He wrote a column for Slate called "The Spectator"; as of 2024, its last post was in 2016. In 2009, one of Rosenbaum's Spectator columns was a lengthy sardonic critique of pop music icon Billy Joel entitled "The Worst Pop Singer Ever."

In The Shakespeare Wars, he wrote about recent controversies among literary historians, actors, and directors over how the works of William Shakespeare should be read, understood, and produced.

His book How the End Begins: The Road to a Nuclear World War III (2011), addresses the paradoxes of deterrence, the danger of nuclear proliferation, and whether the bomb comprises an argument about warfare and genocide.

In December 2015, Rosenbaum published the article "Thinking the Unthinkable" in Tablet, in which he expresses his view that there exists a frightening possibility that Israel might not survive as a nation. In it, he writes that, "The Palestinians want a Hitlerite Judenrein state, however much violence it takes to accomplish it. Not separation, elimination." The Palestinians are, he asserts, engaged in incessant state and religious incitement to murder Jews. The "stabbing intifada" is not an insurgency, but a matter of "the ritual murder of Jews", and claims that whereas Hitler tried to hide his crimes, the Palestinians celebrate killing Jews.

== Bibliography ==
=== Books ===
- The Secret Parts of Fortune (2011)
- Rosenbaum, Ron (2006). The Shakespeare Wars: Clashing Scholars, Public Fiascos, Palace Coups. New York: Random House.
- How the End Begins: The Road to a Nuclear World War III
- Explaining Hitler: The Search for the Origins of His Evil
- Travels with Dr. Death and Other Unusual Investigations (1991)
- Rosenbaum, Ron (1978). Murder at Elaine's. New York: Stonehill.

=== Articles ===
- "The Devil in Long Island". The New York Times Magazine. 22 August 1993.
- "The Great Ivy League Nude Posture Photo Scandal". New York Times Magazine. 15 January 1995.
- Rosenbaum, Ron (January 2013). "The spy who came in from the cold 2.0". Interview. Smithsonian. 43 (9): 24–28.
- "Against Normalization: The Lesson of the 'Munich Post'", Los Angeles Review of Books, 5 February 2017

== See also ==
- List of Adolf Hitler books
- The Secret History of Hacking, a 2001 documentary film featuring Rosenbaum.
